This is a partial list of unnumbered minor planets for principal provisional designations assigned during 1–15 October 2004. Since this period yielded a high number of provisional discoveries, it is further split into several standalone pages. , a total of 517 bodies remain unnumbered for this period. Objects for this year are listed on the following pages: A–B · C · D–E · F · G–H · J–O · P–Q · Ri · Rii · Riii · S · Ti · Tii · Tiii · Tiv · U–V · W–X and Y. Also see previous and next year.

T 

|- id="2004 TN300" bgcolor=#fefefe
| 1 ||  || MBA-I || 19.53 || data-sort-value="0.37" | 370 m || multiple || 2004–2021 || 30 Nov 2021 || 35 || align=left | Disc.: Spacewatch || 
|- id="2004 TY300" bgcolor=#d6d6d6
| 0 ||  || MBA-O || 17.3 || 1.9 km || multiple || 2004–2020 || 16 Dec 2020 || 56 || align=left | Disc.: SpacewatchAdded on 24 December 2021 || 
|- id="2004 TZ300" bgcolor=#fefefe
| 0 ||  || MBA-I || 18.67 || data-sort-value="0.55" | 550 m || multiple || 2000–2021 || 14 Apr 2021 || 61 || align=left | Disc.: Spacewatch || 
|- id="2004 TA301" bgcolor=#E9E9E9
| 0 ||  || MBA-M || 17.4 || 1.8 km || multiple || 2004–2021 || 12 May 2021 || 69 || align=left | Disc.: SpacewatchAlt.: 2016 GN54, 2016 GE123 || 
|- id="2004 TD301" bgcolor=#d6d6d6
| 0 ||  || MBA-O || 16.97 || 2.2 km || multiple || 2004–2022 || 22 Jan 2022 || 87 || align=left | Disc.: SpacewatchAlt.: 2015 TS90 || 
|- id="2004 TH302" bgcolor=#E9E9E9
| 0 ||  || MBA-M || 17.72 || 1.2 km || multiple || 2004–2022 || 21 Jan 2022 || 95 || align=left | Disc.: LINEARAlt.: 2014 BR49 || 
|- id="2004 TO303" bgcolor=#E9E9E9
| 0 ||  || MBA-M || 17.9 || 1.1 km || multiple || 2004–2017 || 28 Sep 2017 || 31 || align=left | Disc.: SpacewatchAdded on 21 August 2021 || 
|- id="2004 TP303" bgcolor=#E9E9E9
| 2 ||  || MBA-M || 18.5 || data-sort-value="0.59" | 590 m || multiple || 2004–2016 || 07 Aug 2016 || 61 || align=left | Disc.: SpacewatchAlt.: 2012 QG46, 2014 AR60 || 
|- id="2004 TA304" bgcolor=#E9E9E9
| 1 ||  || MBA-M || 18.53 || data-sort-value="0.83" | 830 m || multiple || 2004–2021 || 24 Nov 2021 || 63 || align=left | Disc.: Spacewatch || 
|- id="2004 TG304" bgcolor=#d6d6d6
| 0 ||  || MBA-O || 16.40 || 2.9 km || multiple || 2004–2021 || 07 Nov 2021 || 69 || align=left | Disc.: SpacewatchAdded on 5 November 2021Alt.: 2021 RM4 || 
|- id="2004 TT304" bgcolor=#d6d6d6
| 0 ||  || MBA-O || 16.86 || 2.4 km || multiple || 2004–2021 || 08 Nov 2021 || 76 || align=left | Disc.: SpacewatchAdded on 21 August 2021Alt.: 2015 PG345 || 
|- id="2004 TX304" bgcolor=#fefefe
| 1 ||  || MBA-I || 18.5 || data-sort-value="0.59" | 590 m || multiple || 2004–2020 || 25 Feb 2020 || 56 || align=left | Disc.: Spacewatch || 
|- id="2004 TH305" bgcolor=#d6d6d6
| 0 ||  || MBA-O || 18.0 || 1.4 km || multiple || 2004–2020 || 23 Nov 2020 || 47 || align=left | Disc.: SpacewatchAdded on 17 January 2021 || 
|- id="2004 TV305" bgcolor=#d6d6d6
| 0 ||  || MBA-O || 15.90 || 3.7 km || multiple || 2004–2021 || 28 Nov 2021 || 226 || align=left | Disc.: LINEARAlt.: 2010 OZ85 || 
|- id="2004 TB306" bgcolor=#fefefe
| 0 ||  || MBA-I || 18.15 || data-sort-value="0.70" | 700 m || multiple || 2004–2022 || 07 Jan 2022 || 122 || align=left | Disc.: LINEARAlt.: 2011 WS68 || 
|- id="2004 TH307" bgcolor=#E9E9E9
| 0 ||  || MBA-M || 17.3 || 1.0 km || multiple || 2004–2019 || 05 Apr 2019 || 51 || align=left | Disc.: LINEARAlt.: 2008 SZ172, 2016 NM26 || 
|- id="2004 TH308" bgcolor=#fefefe
| 0 ||  || MBA-I || 17.76 || data-sort-value="0.83" | 830 m || multiple || 2004–2021 || 03 May 2021 || 165 || align=left | Disc.: LINEAR || 
|- id="2004 TM308" bgcolor=#E9E9E9
| 0 ||  || MBA-M || 16.66 || 2.6 km || multiple || 2004–2021 || 30 Jul 2021 || 101 || align=left | Disc.: LINEARAlt.: 2015 BS295 || 
|- id="2004 TP308" bgcolor=#d6d6d6
| 1 ||  || MBA-O || 17.6 || 1.7 km || multiple || 2004–2020 || 14 Dec 2020 || 165 || align=left | Disc.: Spacewatch || 
|- id="2004 TC309" bgcolor=#fefefe
| 0 ||  || MBA-I || 19.0 || data-sort-value="0.47" | 470 m || multiple || 2004–2020 || 23 Jan 2020 || 37 || align=left | Disc.: SpacewatchAdded on 22 July 2020 || 
|- id="2004 TM309" bgcolor=#E9E9E9
| 0 ||  || MBA-M || 18.21 || data-sort-value="0.96" | 960 m || multiple || 2004–2021 || 07 Nov 2021 || 69 || align=left | Disc.: SpacewatchAdded on 5 November 2021Alt.: 2021 RQ10 || 
|- id="2004 TN309" bgcolor=#fefefe
| 1 ||  || HUN || 19.5 || data-sort-value="0.37" | 370 m || multiple || 2004–2019 || 07 May 2019 || 33 || align=left | Disc.: Spacewatch || 
|- id="2004 TX309" bgcolor=#fefefe
| 0 ||  || MBA-I || 19.04 || data-sort-value="0.46" | 460 m || multiple || 2004–2021 || 30 Oct 2021 || 71 || align=left | Disc.: SpacewatchAdded on 5 November 2021Alt.: 2014 QH99 || 
|- id="2004 TY309" bgcolor=#E9E9E9
| 0 ||  || MBA-M || 17.80 || 1.2 km || multiple || 2004–2021 || 06 Nov 2021 || 96 || align=left | Disc.: Spacewatch || 
|- id="2004 TT310" bgcolor=#fefefe
| 1 ||  || MBA-I || 16.5 || 1.5 km || multiple || 2004–2021 || 22 Jan 2021 || 192 || align=left | Disc.: LINEAR || 
|- id="2004 TR311" bgcolor=#E9E9E9
| 0 ||  || MBA-M || 18.48 || data-sort-value="0.60" | 600 m || multiple || 2004–2021 || 30 Nov 2021 || 47 || align=left | Disc.: SpacewatchAdded on 24 December 2021 || 
|- id="2004 TV311" bgcolor=#d6d6d6
| 0 ||  || MBA-O || 17.5 || 1.8 km || multiple || 2004–2020 || 04 Jan 2020 || 48 || align=left | Disc.: SpacewatchAlt.: 2009 WO145, 2009 WW269 || 
|- id="2004 TH312" bgcolor=#d6d6d6
| 0 ||  || MBA-O || 16.28 || 3.1 km || multiple || 2004–2021 || 03 Oct 2021 || 137 || align=left | Disc.: Spacewatch || 
|- id="2004 TL312" bgcolor=#d6d6d6
| 0 ||  || MBA-O || 17.0 || 2.2 km || multiple || 2004–2020 || 07 Oct 2020 || 95 || align=left | Disc.: SpacewatchAdded on 13 September 2020Alt.: 2014 KV88, 2015 UA26 || 
|- id="2004 TT312" bgcolor=#E9E9E9
| 0 ||  || MBA-M || 18.13 || data-sort-value="0.99" | 990 m || multiple || 2000–2021 || 27 Oct 2021 || 188 || align=left | Disc.: SpacewatchAdded on 30 September 2021Alt.: 2010 AM19 || 
|- id="2004 TY312" bgcolor=#d6d6d6
| 0 ||  || MBA-O || 17.0 || 2.2 km || multiple || 2004–2020 || 17 Oct 2020 || 50 || align=left | Disc.: SpacewatchAdded on 17 January 2021 || 
|- id="2004 TN313" bgcolor=#E9E9E9
| 0 ||  || MBA-M || 17.27 || 2.0 km || multiple || 2004–2021 || 13 May 2021 || 104 || align=left | Disc.: SpacewatchAlt.: 2010 BW114 || 
|- id="2004 TR313" bgcolor=#E9E9E9
| 2 ||  || MBA-M || 18.62 || data-sort-value="0.79" | 790 m || multiple || 2004–2021 || 07 Nov 2021 || 30 || align=left | Disc.: SpacewatchAdded on 5 November 2021 || 
|- id="2004 TC314" bgcolor=#E9E9E9
| 0 ||  || MBA-M || 17.4 || 1.8 km || multiple || 1997–2020 || 16 Mar 2020 || 84 || align=left | Disc.: SpacewatchAdded on 22 July 2020 || 
|- id="2004 TO314" bgcolor=#d6d6d6
| 0 ||  || MBA-O || 17.2 || 2.0 km || multiple || 2004–2021 || 04 Jan 2021 || 71 || align=left | Disc.: SpacewatchAlt.: 2009 SW150 || 
|- id="2004 TP314" bgcolor=#fefefe
| 0 ||  || HUN || 18.2 || data-sort-value="0.68" | 680 m || multiple || 2004–2020 || 16 Oct 2020 || 87 || align=left | Disc.: SpacewatchAlt.: 2014 KW22 || 
|- id="2004 TX314" bgcolor=#E9E9E9
| 2 ||  || MBA-M || 18.5 || data-sort-value="0.59" | 590 m || multiple || 2002–2016 || 07 Aug 2016 || 37 || align=left | Disc.: SpacewatchAlt.: 2012 QC3 || 
|- id="2004 TG315" bgcolor=#d6d6d6
| 2 ||  || MBA-O || 17.4 || 1.8 km || multiple || 2004–2020 || 05 Nov 2020 || 60 || align=left | Disc.: Spacewatch || 
|- id="2004 TJ315" bgcolor=#E9E9E9
| 0 ||  || MBA-M || 18.04 || 1.0 km || multiple || 2003–2021 || 09 Oct 2021 || 86 || align=left | Disc.: SpacewatchAdded on 22 July 2020 || 
|- id="2004 TM315" bgcolor=#fefefe
| 0 ||  || MBA-I || 18.2 || data-sort-value="0.68" | 680 m || multiple || 2004–2019 || 27 Nov 2019 || 102 || align=left | Disc.: SpacewatchAlt.: 2015 MH73 || 
|- id="2004 TO315" bgcolor=#fefefe
| 1 ||  || MBA-I || 19.4 || data-sort-value="0.39" | 390 m || multiple || 2004–2020 || 16 May 2020 || 25 || align=left | Disc.: SpacewatchAdded on 24 December 2021 || 
|- id="2004 TR315" bgcolor=#d6d6d6
| 2 ||  || MBA-O || 17.1 || 2.1 km || multiple || 2004–2021 || 05 Jan 2021 || 54 || align=left | Disc.: SpacewatchAdded on 17 January 2021 || 
|- id="2004 TT315" bgcolor=#E9E9E9
| 0 ||  || MBA-M || 17.47 || 1.3 km || multiple || 2003–2021 || 07 Nov 2021 || 146 || align=left | Disc.: Spacewatch || 
|- id="2004 TZ315" bgcolor=#E9E9E9
| 1 ||  || MBA-M || 18.1 || data-sort-value="0.71" | 710 m || multiple || 2000–2021 || 08 Dec 2021 || 38 || align=left | Disc.: SpacewatchAdded on 24 December 2021 || 
|- id="2004 TJ316" bgcolor=#E9E9E9
| 0 ||  || MBA-M || 17.4 || 1.8 km || multiple || 1995–2020 || 23 Mar 2020 || 59 || align=left | Disc.: Spacewatch || 
|- id="2004 TS316" bgcolor=#E9E9E9
| 0 ||  || MBA-M || 17.98 || 1.1 km || multiple || 2004–2021 || 25 Nov 2021 || 78 || align=left | Disc.: Spacewatch || 
|- id="2004 TT316" bgcolor=#d6d6d6
| 2 ||  || MBA-O || 17.8 || 1.5 km || multiple || 2004–2020 || 22 Oct 2020 || 28 || align=left | Disc.: SpacewatchAdded on 17 January 2021 || 
|- id="2004 TU316" bgcolor=#E9E9E9
| 0 ||  || MBA-M || 17.9 || 1.1 km || multiple || 2002–2021 || 12 Sep 2021 || 53 || align=left | Disc.: SpacewatchAdded on 30 September 2021Alt.: 2021 QK35 || 
|- id="2004 TC317" bgcolor=#fefefe
| 0 ||  || MBA-I || 18.05 || data-sort-value="0.73" | 730 m || multiple || 2004–2021 || 14 Apr 2021 || 66 || align=left | Disc.: Spacewatch || 
|- id="2004 TH317" bgcolor=#E9E9E9
| 0 ||  || MBA-M || 17.74 || 1.2 km || multiple || 2004–2021 || 24 Sep 2021 || 119 || align=left | Disc.: SpacewatchAlt.: 2017 TB11 || 
|- id="2004 TK317" bgcolor=#d6d6d6
| 0 ||  || MBA-O || 17.20 || 2.0 km || multiple || 2004–2022 || 06 Jan 2022 || 52 || align=left | Disc.: Spacewatch || 
|- id="2004 TL317" bgcolor=#E9E9E9
| 0 ||  || MBA-M || 17.51 || 1.8 km || multiple || 2004–2021 || 08 Jun 2021 || 76 || align=left | Disc.: Spacewatch || 
|- id="2004 TN317" bgcolor=#fefefe
| 2 ||  || MBA-I || 18.5 || data-sort-value="0.59" | 590 m || multiple || 2004–2018 || 01 Oct 2018 || 68 || align=left | Disc.: SpacewatchAlt.: 2011 QY59 || 
|- id="2004 TT317" bgcolor=#fefefe
| 0 ||  || MBA-I || 17.66 || data-sort-value="0.87" | 870 m || multiple || 2004–2021 || 08 Apr 2021 || 117 || align=left | Disc.: Spacewatch || 
|- id="2004 TA318" bgcolor=#d6d6d6
| 0 ||  || MBA-O || 16.77 || 2.5 km || multiple || 1993–2022 || 06 Jan 2022 || 79 || align=left | Disc.: SpacewatchAlt.: 2015 VG10 || 
|- id="2004 TD318" bgcolor=#E9E9E9
| 0 ||  || MBA-M || 16.9 || 2.3 km || multiple || 2004–2020 || 22 Mar 2020 || 62 || align=left | Disc.: SpacewatchAlt.: 2015 DL115 || 
|- id="2004 TG318" bgcolor=#d6d6d6
| 0 ||  || HIL || 16.70 || 2.5 km || multiple || 2004–2022 || 25 Jan 2022 || 61 || align=left | Disc.: Spacewatch || 
|- id="2004 TK318" bgcolor=#E9E9E9
| 2 ||  || MBA-M || 18.5 || 1.1 km || multiple || 2004–2013 || 08 Nov 2013 || 18 || align=left | Disc.: Spacewatch || 
|- id="2004 TS318" bgcolor=#E9E9E9
| 0 ||  || MBA-M || 17.28 || 1.9 km || multiple || 2004–2021 || 04 May 2021 || 104 || align=left | Disc.: Spacewatch || 
|- id="2004 TZ318" bgcolor=#fefefe
| – ||  || MBA-I || 19.6 || data-sort-value="0.36" | 360 m || single || 8 days || 15 Oct 2004 || 9 || align=left | Disc.: Spacewatch || 
|- id="2004 TD319" bgcolor=#fefefe
| 3 ||  || MBA-I || 18.9 || data-sort-value="0.49" | 490 m || multiple || 2000–2012 || 08 Dec 2012 || 27 || align=left | Disc.: SpacewatchAlt.: 2008 UW194 || 
|- id="2004 TF319" bgcolor=#fefefe
| 2 ||  || MBA-I || 18.5 || data-sort-value="0.59" | 590 m || multiple || 2004–2021 || 08 Jun 2021 || 54 || align=left | Disc.: SpacewatchAlt.: 2011 SZ97 || 
|- id="2004 TP319" bgcolor=#d6d6d6
| 0 ||  || MBA-O || 16.7 || 2.5 km || multiple || 2004–2020 || 20 Dec 2020 || 132 || align=left | Disc.: SpacewatchAlt.: 2009 UG54, 2014 QP14, 2015 XC131 || 
|- id="2004 TB320" bgcolor=#d6d6d6
| 1 ||  || MBA-O || 17.6 || 1.7 km || multiple || 2004–2020 || 07 Oct 2020 || 49 || align=left | Disc.: SpacewatchAdded on 19 October 2020Alt.: 2015 TY251 || 
|- id="2004 TK320" bgcolor=#d6d6d6
| 0 ||  || MBA-O || 17.12 || 2.1 km || multiple || 2004–2022 || 04 Jan 2022 || 70 || align=left | Disc.: SpacewatchAdded on 17 June 2021Alt.: 2009 SN221 || 
|- id="2004 TO320" bgcolor=#E9E9E9
| 0 ||  || MBA-M || 17.4 || 1.4 km || multiple || 2004–2021 || 04 Oct 2021 || 108 || align=left | Disc.: Spacewatch || 
|- id="2004 TT320" bgcolor=#E9E9E9
| 0 ||  || MBA-M || 18.41 || data-sort-value="0.87" | 870 m || multiple || 2004–2021 || 13 Nov 2021 || 65 || align=left | Disc.: SpacewatchAdded on 5 November 2021 || 
|- id="2004 TL321" bgcolor=#E9E9E9
| 0 ||  || MBA-M || 18.12 || 1.0 km || multiple || 2004–2021 || 27 Oct 2021 || 85 || align=left | Disc.: Spacewatch || 
|- id="2004 TV322" bgcolor=#fefefe
| 0 ||  || MBA-I || 18.2 || data-sort-value="0.68" | 680 m || multiple || 2004–2019 || 19 Nov 2019 || 58 || align=left | Disc.: Spacewatch || 
|- id="2004 TX322" bgcolor=#fefefe
| 0 ||  || MBA-I || 18.00 || data-sort-value="0.75" | 750 m || multiple || 2000–2021 || 08 May 2021 || 89 || align=left | Disc.: Spacewatch || 
|- id="2004 TX323" bgcolor=#E9E9E9
| 1 ||  || MBA-M || 17.8 || data-sort-value="0.82" | 820 m || multiple || 2004–2020 || 24 Jun 2020 || 66 || align=left | Disc.: SpacewatchAlt.: 2008 SX219 || 
|- id="2004 TG325" bgcolor=#d6d6d6
| 0 ||  || MBA-O || 17.49 || 1.8 km || multiple || 2004–2021 || 07 Nov 2021 || 47 || align=left | Disc.: SpacewatchAdded on 19 October 2020Alt.: 2015 UG20 || 
|- id="2004 TL325" bgcolor=#E9E9E9
| 0 ||  || MBA-M || 17.7 || 1.6 km || multiple || 2004–2021 || 08 May 2021 || 35 || align=left | Disc.: LPL/Spacewatch II || 
|- id="2004 TM325" bgcolor=#d6d6d6
| 0 ||  || MBA-O || 17.64 || 1.7 km || multiple || 2004–2021 || 30 Nov 2021 || 51 || align=left | Disc.: LPL/Spacewatch IIAdded on 17 January 2021Alt.: 2015 RV306 || 
|- id="2004 TU325" bgcolor=#d6d6d6
| 0 ||  || MBA-O || 17.8 || 1.5 km || multiple || 2002–2020 || 16 Dec 2020 || 42 || align=left | Disc.: Spacewatch || 
|- id="2004 TX325" bgcolor=#E9E9E9
| 0 ||  || MBA-M || 16.64 || 2.0 km || multiple || 2004–2022 || 06 Jan 2022 || 262 || align=left | Disc.: NEAT || 
|- id="2004 TK326" bgcolor=#E9E9E9
| 0 ||  || MBA-M || 17.71 || 1.2 km || multiple || 2004–2021 || 27 Nov 2021 || 110 || align=left | Disc.: NEATAdded on 30 September 2021 || 
|- id="2004 TL326" bgcolor=#d6d6d6
| 1 ||  || MBA-O || 16.7 || 2.5 km || multiple || 2004–2020 || 25 Nov 2020 || 96 || align=left | Disc.: NEATAlt.: 2014 UQ121 || 
|- id="2004 TM326" bgcolor=#E9E9E9
| 0 ||  || MBA-M || 17.67 || data-sort-value="0.87" | 870 m || multiple || 2004–2021 || 08 Dec 2021 || 66 || align=left | Disc.: NEAT || 
|- id="2004 TP326" bgcolor=#d6d6d6
| 0 ||  || MBA-O || 16.51 || 2.8 km || multiple || 2004–2022 || 04 Jan 2022 || 143 || align=left | Disc.: NEAT || 
|- id="2004 TW326" bgcolor=#d6d6d6
| 0 ||  || MBA-O || 15.97 || 3.6 km || multiple || 2001–2022 || 25 Jan 2022 || 221 || align=left | Disc.: NEAT || 
|- id="2004 TA327" bgcolor=#fefefe
| 0 ||  || MBA-I || 16.7 || 1.4 km || multiple || 2004–2020 || 06 Jan 2020 || 193 || align=left | Disc.: NEATAlt.: 2008 XO10 || 
|- id="2004 TN327" bgcolor=#fefefe
| 0 ||  || MBA-I || 16.9 || 1.2 km || multiple || 1998–2021 || 18 Jan 2021 || 137 || align=left | Disc.: LONEOSAlt.: 2016 XT19 || 
|- id="2004 TP328" bgcolor=#fefefe
| 0 ||  || MBA-I || 18.45 || data-sort-value="0.61" | 610 m || multiple || 2004–2021 || 09 May 2021 || 72 || align=left | Disc.: NEAT || 
|- id="2004 TA329" bgcolor=#E9E9E9
| 0 ||  || MBA-M || 16.99 || 1.2 km || multiple || 2003–2022 || 22 Jan 2022 || 113 || align=left | Disc.: LPL/Spacewatch IIAlt.: 2003 KA1, 2007 JK37 || 
|- id="2004 TD329" bgcolor=#d6d6d6
| 0 ||  || MBA-O || 16.66 || 2.6 km || multiple || 2004–2022 || 27 Jan 2022 || 107 || align=left | Disc.: SpacewatchAlt.: 2015 XF150 || 
|- id="2004 TZ329" bgcolor=#E9E9E9
| 2 ||  || MBA-M || 18.81 || data-sort-value="0.51" | 510 m || multiple || 2004–2022 || 28 Jan 2022 || 32 || align=left | Disc.: SpacewatchAdded on 29 January 2022 || 
|- id="2004 TA330" bgcolor=#E9E9E9
| 2 ||  || MBA-M || 17.8 || 1.5 km || multiple || 2004–2013 || 21 Oct 2013 || 33 || align=left | Disc.: Spacewatch || 
|- id="2004 TB330" bgcolor=#E9E9E9
| 0 ||  || MBA-M || 17.35 || 1.9 km || multiple || 1999–2021 || 11 May 2021 || 115 || align=left | Disc.: SpacewatchAlt.: 2007 HO3, 2009 WX72, 2011 CO102 || 
|- id="2004 TH330" bgcolor=#d6d6d6
| 1 ||  || MBA-O || 17.6 || 1.7 km || multiple || 2004–2020 || 24 Oct 2020 || 30 || align=left | Disc.: SpacewatchAdded on 17 January 2021 || 
|- id="2004 TJ330" bgcolor=#d6d6d6
| 0 ||  || MBA-O || 17.31 || 1.9 km || multiple || 2004–2021 || 30 Nov 2021 || 64 || align=left | Disc.: Spacewatch || 
|- id="2004 TK330" bgcolor=#fefefe
| 1 ||  || MBA-I || 18.9 || data-sort-value="0.49" | 490 m || multiple || 2004–2019 || 31 Oct 2019 || 28 || align=left | Disc.: Spacewatch || 
|- id="2004 TP330" bgcolor=#fefefe
| 2 ||  || MBA-I || 18.70 || data-sort-value="0.54" | 540 m || multiple || 2004–2018 || 10 Nov 2018 || 35 || align=left | Disc.: SpacewatchAdded on 21 August 2021 || 
|- id="2004 TQ331" bgcolor=#d6d6d6
| 0 ||  || MBA-O || 16.2 || 3.2 km || multiple || 2001–2020 || 20 Dec 2020 || 161 || align=left | Disc.: SpacewatchAlt.: 2009 SB90, 2014 QV16, 2015 WG4 || 
|- id="2004 TT331" bgcolor=#fefefe
| 0 ||  || MBA-I || 18.3 || data-sort-value="0.65" | 650 m || multiple || 2004–2019 || 31 Oct 2019 || 67 || align=left | Disc.: Spacewatch || 
|- id="2004 TB332" bgcolor=#E9E9E9
| 0 ||  || MBA-M || 17.6 || 1.7 km || multiple || 2004–2020 || 19 Apr 2020 || 42 || align=left | Disc.: Spacewatch || 
|- id="2004 TF332" bgcolor=#fefefe
| 1 ||  || MBA-I || 19.1 || data-sort-value="0.45" | 450 m || multiple || 2004–2018 || 05 Oct 2018 || 46 || align=left | Disc.: SpacewatchAlt.: 2011 SZ242 || 
|- id="2004 TJ332" bgcolor=#d6d6d6
| 0 ||  || MBA-O || 16.66 || 2.6 km || multiple || 2004–2022 || 23 Jan 2022 || 74 || align=left | Disc.: SpacewatchAdded on 22 July 2020 || 
|- id="2004 TN332" bgcolor=#E9E9E9
| 2 ||  || MBA-M || 18.36 || 1.2 km || multiple || 2004–2018 || 12 Nov 2018 || 49 || align=left | Disc.: SpacewatchAdded on 22 July 2020Alt.: 2018 TY15 || 
|- id="2004 TH333" bgcolor=#fefefe
| 0 ||  || MBA-I || 18.1 || data-sort-value="0.71" | 710 m || multiple || 2004–2020 || 23 Mar 2020 || 86 || align=left | Disc.: Spacewatch || 
|- id="2004 TL333" bgcolor=#d6d6d6
| 0 ||  || MBA-O || 16.27 || 3.1 km || multiple || 2004–2022 || 25 Jan 2022 || 201 || align=left | Disc.: SpacewatchAlt.: 2009 SH45 || 
|- id="2004 TQ333" bgcolor=#E9E9E9
| 0 ||  || MBA-M || 17.42 || 1.8 km || multiple || 1995–2021 || 01 Jul 2021 || 78 || align=left | Disc.: SpacewatchAlt.: 2012 MC2 || 
|- id="2004 TE334" bgcolor=#d6d6d6
| 0 ||  || MBA-O || 17.54 || 1.7 km || multiple || 2004–2020 || 13 Aug 2020 || 40 || align=left | Disc.: SpacewatchAlt.: 2015 VK55 || 
|- id="2004 TJ334" bgcolor=#fefefe
| 0 ||  || MBA-I || 18.0 || data-sort-value="0.75" | 750 m || multiple || 2004–2019 || 19 Dec 2019 || 81 || align=left | Disc.: Spacewatch || 
|- id="2004 TP334" bgcolor=#E9E9E9
| 1 ||  || MBA-M || 18.4 || data-sort-value="0.62" | 620 m || multiple || 2002–2020 || 23 Aug 2020 || 49 || align=left | Disc.: Spacewatch || 
|- id="2004 TW334" bgcolor=#d6d6d6
| 0 ||  || MBA-O || 16.84 || 2.4 km || multiple || 2004–2021 || 26 Nov 2021 || 62 || align=left | Disc.: SpacewatchAdded on 21 August 2021 || 
|- id="2004 TA335" bgcolor=#d6d6d6
| 0 ||  || MBA-O || 17.42 || 1.8 km || multiple || 2004–2021 || 30 Nov 2021 || 92 || align=left | Disc.: SpacewatchAlt.: 2010 WV66 || 
|- id="2004 TA336" bgcolor=#d6d6d6
| 0 ||  || MBA-O || 16.7 || 2.5 km || multiple || 2004–2020 || 16 Nov 2020 || 138 || align=left | Disc.: Spacewatch || 
|- id="2004 TF336" bgcolor=#fefefe
| 1 ||  || MBA-I || 18.5 || data-sort-value="0.59" | 590 m || multiple || 2004–2018 || 14 Jun 2018 || 39 || align=left | Disc.: Spacewatch || 
|- id="2004 TS337" bgcolor=#fefefe
| 1 ||  || MBA-I || 18.6 || data-sort-value="0.57" | 570 m || multiple || 2004–2018 || 14 Aug 2018 || 45 || align=left | Disc.: SpacewatchAlt.: 2008 XS9 || 
|- id="2004 TX337" bgcolor=#d6d6d6
| 0 ||  || MBA-O || 16.7 || 2.5 km || multiple || 2004–2020 || 15 Oct 2020 || 93 || align=left | Disc.: Spacewatch || 
|- id="2004 TM338" bgcolor=#d6d6d6
| 0 ||  || MBA-O || 16.51 || 2.8 km || multiple || 2004–2022 || 27 Jan 2022 || 82 || align=left | Disc.: Spacewatch || 
|- id="2004 TN338" bgcolor=#E9E9E9
| 1 ||  || MBA-M || 17.8 || 1.5 km || multiple || 2002–2019 || 09 Jan 2019 || 46 || align=left | Disc.: SpacewatchAdded on 22 July 2020Alt.: 2010 GG54, 2013 TX139 || 
|- id="2004 TR338" bgcolor=#fefefe
| 1 ||  || MBA-I || 18.5 || data-sort-value="0.59" | 590 m || multiple || 2003–2018 || 29 Nov 2018 || 44 || align=left | Disc.: SpacewatchAlt.: 2018 VA50 || 
|- id="2004 TW338" bgcolor=#d6d6d6
| 0 ||  || MBA-O || 16.50 || 2.8 km || multiple || 2004–2021 || 31 Oct 2021 || 92 || align=left | Disc.: Spacewatch || 
|- id="2004 TJ339" bgcolor=#d6d6d6
| 0 ||  || MBA-O || 17.3 || 1.9 km || multiple || 1999–2018 || 17 Aug 2018 || 73 || align=left | Disc.: SpacewatchAlt.: 2009 VF13 || 
|- id="2004 TM339" bgcolor=#fefefe
| 2 ||  || MBA-I || 18.6 || data-sort-value="0.57" | 570 m || multiple || 2004–2019 || 26 Sep 2019 || 32 || align=left | Disc.: SpacewatchAlt.: 2015 PG92 || 
|- id="2004 TW340" bgcolor=#fefefe
| 0 ||  || MBA-I || 18.29 || data-sort-value="0.65" | 650 m || multiple || 2004–2021 || 15 Apr 2021 || 67 || align=left | Disc.: Spacewatch || 
|- id="2004 TX340" bgcolor=#fefefe
| 0 ||  || MBA-I || 17.4 || data-sort-value="0.98" | 980 m || multiple || 2004–2019 || 17 Dec 2019 || 92 || align=left | Disc.: Spacewatch || 
|- id="2004 TB341" bgcolor=#E9E9E9
| 0 ||  || MBA-M || 17.6 || 1.7 km || multiple || 2002–2017 || 24 Jun 2017 || 43 || align=left | Disc.: Spacewatch || 
|- id="2004 TC341" bgcolor=#fefefe
| 0 ||  || MBA-I || 18.4 || data-sort-value="0.62" | 620 m || multiple || 2000–2019 || 25 Nov 2019 || 65 || align=left | Disc.: SpacewatchAlt.: 2015 PP91 || 
|- id="2004 TF341" bgcolor=#d6d6d6
| 0 ||  || MBA-O || 17.09 || 2.1 km || multiple || 2004–2022 || 07 Jan 2022 || 62 || align=left | Disc.: SpacewatchAdded on 19 October 2020 || 
|- id="2004 TY341" bgcolor=#E9E9E9
| 0 ||  || MBA-M || 18.11 || 1.0 km || multiple || 2004–2022 || 22 Jan 2022 || 66 || align=left | Disc.: SpacewatchAdded on 5 November 2021 || 
|- id="2004 TP342" bgcolor=#fefefe
| 0 ||  || MBA-I || 18.38 || data-sort-value="0.63" | 630 m || multiple || 2000–2021 || 08 May 2021 || 53 || align=left | Disc.: SpacewatchAlt.: 2015 TH206 || 
|- id="2004 TV342" bgcolor=#E9E9E9
| 0 ||  || MBA-M || 17.86 || 1.1 km || multiple || 2004–2021 || 09 Nov 2021 || 78 || align=left | Disc.: Spacewatch || 
|- id="2004 TZ342" bgcolor=#E9E9E9
| 0 ||  || MBA-M || 17.3 || 1.9 km || multiple || 1995–2020 || 26 Apr 2020 || 62 || align=left | Disc.: Spacewatch || 
|- id="2004 TE343" bgcolor=#E9E9E9
| 0 ||  || MBA-M || 18.33 || data-sort-value="0.91" | 910 m || multiple || 2004–2022 || 04 Jan 2022 || 44 || align=left | Disc.: Spacewatch || 
|- id="2004 TU343" bgcolor=#fefefe
| 0 ||  || MBA-I || 17.8 || data-sort-value="0.82" | 820 m || multiple || 2004–2020 || 21 Mar 2020 || 69 || align=left | Disc.: NEAT || 
|- id="2004 TB344" bgcolor=#E9E9E9
| 0 ||  || MBA-M || 17.79 || 1.2 km || multiple || 2004–2022 || 25 Jan 2022 || 143 || align=left | Disc.: Spacewatch || 
|- id="2004 TE344" bgcolor=#E9E9E9
| 1 ||  || MBA-M || 18.39 || data-sort-value="0.88" | 880 m || multiple || 2004–2021 || 29 Nov 2021 || 41 || align=left | Disc.: SpacewatchAdded on 24 December 2021 || 
|- id="2004 TG344" bgcolor=#E9E9E9
| 2 ||  || MBA-M || 18.4 || data-sort-value="0.88" | 880 m || multiple || 2004–2021 || 06 Nov 2021 || 40 || align=left | Disc.: SpacewatchAdded on 29 January 2022 || 
|- id="2004 TM345" bgcolor=#d6d6d6
| 0 ||  || MBA-O || 17.10 || 2.1 km || multiple || 2004–2021 || 28 Nov 2021 || 106 || align=left | Disc.: SpacewatchAlt.: 2015 RP70 || 
|- id="2004 TX345" bgcolor=#d6d6d6
| 0 ||  || MBA-O || 16.9 || 2.3 km || multiple || 2004–2020 || 13 Nov 2020 || 97 || align=left | Disc.: SpacewatchAlt.: 2015 VO82 || 
|- id="2004 TE346" bgcolor=#d6d6d6
| 0 ||  || MBA-O || 16.45 || 2.9 km || multiple || 2004–2021 || 07 Nov 2021 || 56 || align=left | Disc.: Spacewatch || 
|- id="2004 TG347" bgcolor=#d6d6d6
| 0 ||  || MBA-O || 16.54 || 2.7 km || multiple || 2004–2022 || 27 Jan 2022 || 177 || align=left | Disc.: NEATAlt.: 2009 RM23 || 
|- id="2004 TH347" bgcolor=#E9E9E9
| 0 ||  || MBA-M || 16.75 || 2.5 km || multiple || 2004–2021 || 09 Apr 2021 || 130 || align=left | Disc.: LONEOSAlt.: 2013 OE3 || 
|- id="2004 TN347" bgcolor=#d6d6d6
| 0 ||  || MBA-O || 16.1 || 3.4 km || multiple || 2004–2021 || 07 Jan 2021 || 136 || align=left | Disc.: Molėtai Obs. || 
|- id="2004 TO347" bgcolor=#E9E9E9
| E ||  || MBA-M || 17.5 || 1.8 km || single || 4 days || 15 Oct 2004 || 8 || align=left | Disc.: Molėtai Obs. || 
|- id="2004 TU348" bgcolor=#fefefe
| 0 ||  || MBA-I || 18.4 || data-sort-value="0.62" | 620 m || multiple || 2003–2018 || 03 Oct 2018 || 34 || align=left | Disc.: Spacewatch || 
|- id="2004 TB349" bgcolor=#fefefe
| 0 ||  || HUN || 18.4 || data-sort-value="0.62" | 620 m || multiple || 2004–2021 || 12 Jan 2021 || 87 || align=left | Disc.: Spacewatch || 
|- id="2004 TC349" bgcolor=#d6d6d6
| 0 ||  || MBA-O || 17.67 || 1.6 km || multiple || 2004–2021 || 28 Oct 2021 || 31 || align=left | Disc.: SpacewatchAlt.: 2015 PF288 || 
|- id="2004 TD350" bgcolor=#E9E9E9
| 4 ||  || MBA-M || 18.6 || 1.1 km || multiple || 2004–2018 || 29 Nov 2018 || 15 || align=left | Disc.: Kitt PeakAdded on 21 August 2021 || 
|- id="2004 TF350" bgcolor=#E9E9E9
| 0 ||  || MBA-M || 17.84 || data-sort-value="0.80" | 800 m || multiple || 2004–2022 || 01 Jan 2022 || 75 || align=left | Disc.: Kitt Peak Obs. || 
|- id="2004 TH350" bgcolor=#E9E9E9
| 3 ||  || MBA-M || 18.0 || 1.4 km || multiple || 2004–2021 || 09 May 2021 || 23 || align=left | Disc.: Kitt PeakAdded on 21 August 2021Alt.: 2021 HK25 || 
|- id="2004 TJ350" bgcolor=#E9E9E9
| 3 ||  || MBA-M || 18.0 || 1.4 km || multiple || 2004–2018 || 15 Sep 2018 || 27 || align=left | Disc.: Kitt Peak Obs. || 
|- id="2004 TN350" bgcolor=#E9E9E9
| 2 ||  || MBA-M || 18.76 || data-sort-value="0.53" | 530 m || multiple || 2004–2021 || 11 Oct 2021 || 18 || align=left | Disc.: Kitt Peak Obs.Added on 13 September 2020 || 
|- id="2004 TZ350" bgcolor=#d6d6d6
| 0 ||  || MBA-O || 17.06 || 2.2 km || multiple || 2004–2021 || 15 Apr 2021 || 98 || align=left | Disc.: SpacewatchAlt.: 2007 HH63 || 
|- id="2004 TM351" bgcolor=#E9E9E9
| 2 ||  || MBA-M || 18.1 || data-sort-value="0.71" | 710 m || multiple || 2004–2020 || 14 Aug 2020 || 28 || align=left | Disc.: Spacewatch || 
|- id="2004 TU351" bgcolor=#fefefe
| 1 ||  || MBA-I || 18.7 || data-sort-value="0.54" | 540 m || multiple || 2004–2019 || 28 Oct 2019 || 30 || align=left | Disc.: Kitt Peak Obs. || 
|- id="2004 TW351" bgcolor=#E9E9E9
| 2 ||  || MBA-M || 19.05 || data-sort-value="0.46" | 460 m || multiple || 2004–2021 || 09 Dec 2021 || 34 || align=left | Disc.: Kitt PeakAdded on 24 December 2021 || 
|- id="2004 TX351" bgcolor=#fefefe
| 1 ||  || MBA-I || 18.5 || data-sort-value="0.59" | 590 m || multiple || 2004–2019 || 29 Jul 2019 || 29 || align=left | Disc.: Kitt Peak Obs. || 
|- id="2004 TZ351" bgcolor=#d6d6d6
| 0 ||  || MBA-O || 16.5 || 2.8 km || multiple || 2004–2021 || 04 Jan 2021 || 130 || align=left | Disc.: Kitt Peak Obs.Alt.: 2014 QV384 || 
|- id="2004 TA352" bgcolor=#d6d6d6
| 0 ||  || MBA-O || 17.83 || 1.5 km || multiple || 2004–2021 || 11 Nov 2021 || 31 || align=left | Disc.: Kitt Peak Obs.Added on 22 July 2020 || 
|- id="2004 TC352" bgcolor=#fefefe
| 0 ||  || MBA-I || 18.45 || data-sort-value="0.61" | 610 m || multiple || 2004–2021 || 01 Jul 2021 || 89 || align=left | Disc.: Kitt Peak Obs.Alt.: 2015 RF196, 2017 FH82 || 
|- id="2004 TE352" bgcolor=#d6d6d6
| 0 ||  || MBA-O || 17.63 || 1.7 km || multiple || 2004–2021 || 07 Nov 2021 || 27 || align=left | Disc.: Kitt PeakAdded on 5 November 2021 || 
|- id="2004 TQ352" bgcolor=#E9E9E9
| 0 ||  || MBA-M || 18.22 || 1.3 km || multiple || 2004–2021 || 14 Jun 2021 || 37 || align=left | Disc.: Kitt Peak Obs.Alt.: 2016 GD4 || 
|- id="2004 TR352" bgcolor=#E9E9E9
| 0 ||  || MBA-M || 17.7 || 1.6 km || multiple || 2004–2021 || 08 Jun 2021 || 50 || align=left | Disc.: Kitt Peak Obs. || 
|- id="2004 TS352" bgcolor=#E9E9E9
| 0 ||  || MBA-M || 18.4 || data-sort-value="0.88" | 880 m || multiple || 2002–2021 || 15 Sep 2021 || 29 || align=left | Disc.: Kitt PeakAdded on 29 January 2022 || 
|- id="2004 TV352" bgcolor=#fefefe
| 3 ||  || MBA-I || 19.0 || data-sort-value="0.47" | 470 m || multiple || 2004–2020 || 14 Feb 2020 || 33 || align=left | Disc.: Kitt PeakAdded on 17 June 2021Alt.: 2020 BS51 || 
|- id="2004 TZ352" bgcolor=#d6d6d6
| 0 ||  || MBA-O || 17.7 || 1.6 km || multiple || 2004–2021 || 11 Nov 2021 || 26 || align=left | Disc.: Kitt PeakAdded on 29 January 2022 || 
|- id="2004 TA353" bgcolor=#E9E9E9
| 0 ||  || MBA-M || 18.3 || data-sort-value="0.65" | 650 m || multiple || 2004–2020 || 20 Jun 2020 || 39 || align=left | Disc.: Kitt PeakAdded on 21 August 2021Alt.: 2015 FE217 || 
|- id="2004 TB353" bgcolor=#fefefe
| 2 ||  || MBA-I || 19.5 || data-sort-value="0.37" | 370 m || multiple || 2004–2019 || 26 Sep 2019 || 19 || align=left | Disc.: Kitt Peak Obs. || 
|- id="2004 TJ353" bgcolor=#fefefe
| 0 ||  || MBA-I || 17.6 || data-sort-value="0.90" | 900 m || multiple || 2003–2021 || 14 Jan 2021 || 102 || align=left | Disc.: Kitt Peak Obs. || 
|- id="2004 TK353" bgcolor=#d6d6d6
| 2 ||  || MBA-O || 18.0 || 1.4 km || multiple || 2004–2021 || 11 Jan 2021 || 23 || align=left | Disc.: Kitt PeakAdded on 11 May 2021 || 
|- id="2004 TM353" bgcolor=#d6d6d6
| 1 ||  || MBA-O || 16.7 || 2.5 km || multiple || 2004–2019 || 28 Oct 2019 || 67 || align=left | Disc.: Kitt Peak Obs.Alt.: 2014 SN108 || 
|- id="2004 TY353" bgcolor=#d6d6d6
| 1 ||  || MBA-O || 17.7 || 1.6 km || multiple || 2004–2018 || 15 Oct 2018 || 48 || align=left | Disc.: Kitt Peak Obs. || 
|- id="2004 TA354" bgcolor=#E9E9E9
| 0 ||  || MBA-M || 16.76 || 2.5 km || multiple || 2004–2021 || 03 Jul 2021 || 114 || align=left | Disc.: Kitt Peak Obs.Alt.: 2016 HX22, 2017 SE77 || 
|- id="2004 TG354" bgcolor=#E9E9E9
| 0 ||  || MBA-M || 17.4 || 1.8 km || multiple || 1995–2019 || 06 Mar 2019 || 64 || align=left | Disc.: Kitt Peak Obs.Alt.: 2010 CO142, 2013 WG100, 2015 HE100 || 
|- id="2004 TN354" bgcolor=#d6d6d6
| 0 ||  || MBA-O || 17.83 || 1.5 km || multiple || 2004–2022 || 07 Jan 2022 || 46 || align=left | Disc.: Kitt Peak Obs.Added on 19 October 2020 || 
|- id="2004 TT354" bgcolor=#E9E9E9
| 0 ||  || MBA-M || 16.6 || 2.7 km || multiple || 2002–2020 || 28 Apr 2020 || 118 || align=left | Disc.: Kitt Peak Obs.Alt.: 2011 GQ2, 2016 JW4 || 
|- id="2004 TV354" bgcolor=#d6d6d6
| 0 ||  || MBA-O || 16.11 || 3.3 km || multiple || 2001–2022 || 17 Jan 2022 || 133 || align=left | Disc.: Kitt Peak Obs. || 
|- id="2004 TT357" bgcolor=#C2E0FF
| 0 ||  || TNO || 8.0 || 91 km || multiple || 1999–2018 || 14 Nov 2018 || 90 || align=left | Disc.: Kitt Peak Obs.LoUTNOs, res2:5, BR-mag: 1.50; taxonomy: IR; suspected binary || 
|- id="2004 TU357" bgcolor=#C2E0FF
| E ||  || TNO || 8.0 || 140 km || single || 50 days || 10 Nov 2004 || 8 || align=left | Disc.: Kitt Peak Obs.LoUTNOs, centaur || 
|- id="2004 TV357" bgcolor=#C2E0FF
| 1 ||  || TNO || 6.9 || 151 km || multiple || 2004–2020 || 28 Jan 2020 || 129 || align=left | Disc.: Kitt Peak Obs.LoUTNOs, twotino, BR-mag: 1.07; taxonomy: BB || 
|- id="2004 TW357" bgcolor=#C2E0FF
| E ||  || TNO || 7.8 || 130 km || single || 25 days || 09 Nov 2004 || 4 || align=left | Disc.: Kitt Peak Obs.LoUTNOs, plutino? || 
|- id="2004 TX357" bgcolor=#C2E0FF
| 3 ||  || TNO || 8.66 || 67 km || multiple || 1999–2021 || 11 Jan 2021 || 30 || align=left | Disc.: Kitt Peak Obs.LoUTNOs, res3:4, BR-mag: 1.55; taxonomy: IR || 
|- id="2004 TB358" bgcolor=#C2E0FF
| E ||  || TNO || 7.1 || 130 km || single || 34 days || 18 Nov 2004 || 4 || align=left | Disc.: Kitt Peak Obs.LoUTNOs, cubewano? || 
|- id="2004 TL358" bgcolor=#E9E9E9
| 0 ||  || MBA-M || 17.1 || 1.6 km || multiple || 2003–2020 || 16 Mar 2020 || 82 || align=left | Disc.: Kitt Peak Obs. || 
|- id="2004 TV358" bgcolor=#E9E9E9
| 6 ||  || MBA-M || 18.4 || data-sort-value="0.62" | 620 m || multiple || 2004–2014 || 25 Apr 2014 || 14 || align=left | Disc.: Kitt Peak Obs. || 
|- id="2004 TW358" bgcolor=#fefefe
| 0 ||  || MBA-I || 18.89 || data-sort-value="0.50" | 500 m || multiple || 2004–2021 || 25 Sep 2021 || 55 || align=left | Disc.: Kitt Peak Obs. || 
|- id="2004 TB359" bgcolor=#fefefe
| 1 ||  || MBA-I || 19.2 || data-sort-value="0.43" | 430 m || multiple || 2004–2021 || 27 Sep 2021 || 46 || align=left | Disc.: Spacewatch || 
|- id="2004 TB360" bgcolor=#E9E9E9
| 0 ||  || MBA-M || 17.36 || 1.9 km || multiple || 2002–2021 || 04 May 2021 || 103 || align=left | Disc.: Spacewatch || 
|- id="2004 TK360" bgcolor=#E9E9E9
| 0 ||  || MBA-M || 17.24 || 1.5 km || multiple || 2004–2021 || 27 Nov 2021 || 132 || align=left | Disc.: LINEARAdded on 5 November 2021Alt.: 2021 RS12 || 
|- id="2004 TN360" bgcolor=#fefefe
| 0 ||  || MBA-I || 18.3 || data-sort-value="0.65" | 650 m || multiple || 2004–2019 || 04 Dec 2019 || 62 || align=left | Disc.: Spacewatch || 
|- id="2004 TU360" bgcolor=#fefefe
| 0 ||  || MBA-I || 18.64 || data-sort-value="0.56" | 560 m || multiple || 2000–2019 || 25 Sep 2019 || 32 || align=left | Disc.: SpacewatchAdded on 17 June 2021 || 
|- id="2004 TM361" bgcolor=#d6d6d6
| 0 ||  || MBA-O || 16.7 || 2.5 km || multiple || 2004–2020 || 10 Nov 2020 || 99 || align=left | Disc.: Spacewatch || 
|- id="2004 TO361" bgcolor=#E9E9E9
| 3 ||  || MBA-M || 18.2 || data-sort-value="0.96" | 960 m || multiple || 2004–2013 || 26 Nov 2013 || 24 || align=left | Disc.: Spacewatch || 
|- id="2004 TU361" bgcolor=#d6d6d6
| 0 ||  || MBA-O || 17.03 || 2.2 km || multiple || 2004–2022 || 25 Jan 2022 || 102 || align=left | Disc.: SpacewatchAlt.: 2009 RX10, 2009 SW393, 2014 PB31 || 
|- id="2004 TB362" bgcolor=#fefefe
| 0 ||  || MBA-I || 18.87 || data-sort-value="0.50" | 500 m || multiple || 2004–2021 || 04 Aug 2021 || 43 || align=left | Disc.: MLS || 
|- id="2004 TC362" bgcolor=#fefefe
| 0 ||  || MBA-I || 18.03 || data-sort-value="0.74" | 740 m || multiple || 2004–2021 || 09 Apr 2021 || 87 || align=left | Disc.: MLS || 
|- id="2004 TG362" bgcolor=#E9E9E9
| 0 ||  || MBA-M || 18.39 || data-sort-value="0.88" | 880 m || multiple || 2004–2021 || 06 Nov 2021 || 57 || align=left | Disc.: MLS || 
|- id="2004 TJ362" bgcolor=#fefefe
| 0 ||  || MBA-I || 18.02 || data-sort-value="0.74" | 740 m || multiple || 2000–2019 || 25 Sep 2019 || 56 || align=left | Disc.: MLS || 
|- id="2004 TM362" bgcolor=#E9E9E9
| 3 ||  || MBA-M || 19.1 || data-sort-value="0.45" | 450 m || multiple || 2004–2020 || 24 Oct 2020 || 32 || align=left | Disc.: SpacewatchAdded on 5 November 2021 || 
|- id="2004 TX362" bgcolor=#E9E9E9
| 1 ||  || MBA-M || 17.7 || 1.6 km || multiple || 2004–2013 || 22 Oct 2013 || 30 || align=left | Disc.: Spacewatch || 
|- id="2004 TZ362" bgcolor=#E9E9E9
| 0 ||  || MBA-M || 18.07 || 1.0 km || multiple || 2003–2021 || 06 Nov 2021 || 56 || align=left | Disc.: SpacewatchAdded on 22 July 2020 || 
|- id="2004 TU363" bgcolor=#fefefe
| 1 ||  || MBA-I || 18.7 || data-sort-value="0.54" | 540 m || multiple || 2001–2019 || 04 Jul 2019 || 100 || align=left | Disc.: SpacewatchAlt.: 2010 RR139, 2010 RJ162, 2015 BF505 || 
|- id="2004 TQ364" bgcolor=#fefefe
| 2 ||  || MBA-I || 18.3 || data-sort-value="0.65" | 650 m || multiple || 2000–2020 || 17 Dec 2020 || 32 || align=left | Disc.: Spacewatch || 
|- id="2004 TT365" bgcolor=#fefefe
| 0 ||  || MBA-I || 17.65 || data-sort-value="0.88" | 880 m || multiple || 1993–2021 || 08 Apr 2021 || 84 || align=left | Disc.: LINEARAlt.: 2014 HX24 || 
|- id="2004 TU365" bgcolor=#fefefe
| 0 ||  || MBA-I || 18.8 || data-sort-value="0.52" | 520 m || multiple || 2004–2015 || 07 Nov 2015 || 26 || align=left | Disc.: MLS || 
|- id="2004 TZ365" bgcolor=#E9E9E9
| 0 ||  || MBA-M || 17.4 || 1.8 km || multiple || 2004–2020 || 21 Apr 2020 || 49 || align=left | Disc.: MLSAlt.: 2015 BT76 || 
|- id="2004 TK368" bgcolor=#E9E9E9
| 0 ||  || MBA-M || 17.4 || data-sort-value="0.98" | 980 m || multiple || 2004–2020 || 16 Oct 2020 || 120 || align=left | Disc.: SpacewatchAlt.: 2007 ES188, 2008 RN144, 2015 EL43 || 
|- id="2004 TT368" bgcolor=#fefefe
| 3 ||  || MBA-I || 18.9 || data-sort-value="0.49" | 490 m || multiple || 2004–2018 || 13 Dec 2018 || 63 || align=left | Disc.: Spacewatch || 
|- id="2004 TU368" bgcolor=#fefefe
| 0 ||  || MBA-I || 18.1 || data-sort-value="0.71" | 710 m || multiple || 2004–2019 || 25 Sep 2019 || 52 || align=left | Disc.: Spacewatch || 
|- id="2004 TV368" bgcolor=#fefefe
| 0 ||  || MBA-I || 18.1 || data-sort-value="0.71" | 710 m || multiple || 2004–2019 || 20 Dec 2019 || 74 || align=left | Disc.: Spacewatch || 
|- id="2004 TX369" bgcolor=#fefefe
| 0 ||  || MBA-I || 18.58 || data-sort-value="0.57" | 570 m || multiple || 2004–2021 || 07 Apr 2021 || 52 || align=left | Disc.: Spacewatch || 
|- id="2004 TH370" bgcolor=#d6d6d6
| 0 ||  || MBA-O || 17.58 || 1.7 km || multiple || 2004–2021 || 07 Nov 2021 || 69 || align=left | Disc.: SpacewatchAlt.: 2010 VL118 || 
|- id="2004 TN370" bgcolor=#E9E9E9
| 0 ||  || MBA-M || 18.10 || 1.0 km || multiple || 2004–2021 || 30 Nov 2021 || 85 || align=left | Disc.: Spacewatch || 
|- id="2004 TT370" bgcolor=#d6d6d6
| 1 ||  || MBA-O || 18.2 || 1.3 km || multiple || 2004–2020 || 21 Oct 2020 || 63 || align=left | Disc.: LPL/Spacewatch IIAdded on 19 October 2020 || 
|- id="2004 TJ371" bgcolor=#d6d6d6
| 0 ||  || MBA-O || 17.85 || 1.5 km || multiple || 2003–2022 || 06 Jan 2022 || 128 || align=left | Disc.: SpacewatchAdded on 17 January 2021 || 
|- id="2004 TN371" bgcolor=#d6d6d6
| 0 ||  || HIL || 15.69 || 4.1 km || multiple || 2004–2022 || 12 Jan 2022 || 129 || align=left | Disc.: Spacewatch || 
|- id="2004 TO371" bgcolor=#d6d6d6
| 0 ||  || HIL || 16.55 || 2.7 km || multiple || 2004–2022 || 25 Jan 2022 || 84 || align=left | Disc.: Kitt Peak Obs. || 
|- id="2004 TU371" bgcolor=#fefefe
| 1 ||  || MBA-I || 17.7 || data-sort-value="0.86" | 860 m || multiple || 2004–2021 || 08 Jun 2021 || 45 || align=left | Disc.: LONEOS || 
|- id="2004 TV371" bgcolor=#fefefe
| 0 ||  || MBA-I || 18.5 || data-sort-value="0.59" | 590 m || multiple || 2004–2019 || 28 Aug 2019 || 29 || align=left | Disc.: MLS || 
|- id="2004 TW371" bgcolor=#E9E9E9
| 0 ||  || MBA-M || 18.54 || data-sort-value="0.58" | 580 m || multiple || 2004–2022 || 27 Jan 2022 || 84 || align=left | Disc.: MLS || 
|- id="2004 TY371" bgcolor=#fefefe
| 0 ||  || MBA-I || 18.0 || data-sort-value="0.75" | 750 m || multiple || 1997–2020 || 19 Apr 2020 || 107 || align=left | Disc.: Spacewatch || 
|- id="2004 TA372" bgcolor=#E9E9E9
| 0 ||  || MBA-M || 17.04 || 1.6 km || multiple || 2004–2021 || 06 Dec 2021 || 207 || align=left | Disc.: NEATAlt.: 2010 HD92 || 
|- id="2004 TD372" bgcolor=#E9E9E9
| 0 ||  || MBA-M || 16.98 || 2.2 km || multiple || 2004–2021 || 13 May 2021 || 103 || align=left | Disc.: Spacewatch || 
|- id="2004 TE372" bgcolor=#fefefe
| 0 ||  || MBA-I || 17.60 || data-sort-value="0.90" | 900 m || multiple || 2004–2021 || 09 Apr 2021 || 105 || align=left | Disc.: Spacewatch || 
|- id="2004 TG372" bgcolor=#fefefe
| 0 ||  || MBA-I || 18.05 || data-sort-value="0.73" | 730 m || multiple || 2004–2021 || 09 Dec 2021 || 117 || align=left | Disc.: Kitt Peak Obs. || 
|- id="2004 TH372" bgcolor=#fefefe
| 0 ||  || MBA-I || 17.9 || data-sort-value="0.78" | 780 m || multiple || 2004–2021 || 04 Jan 2021 || 103 || align=left | Disc.: Kitt Peak Obs. || 
|- id="2004 TL372" bgcolor=#E9E9E9
| 0 ||  || MBA-M || 17.06 || 1.2 km || multiple || 2004–2022 || 25 Jan 2022 || 178 || align=left | Disc.: NEAT || 
|- id="2004 TM372" bgcolor=#fefefe
| 0 ||  || MBA-I || 18.24 || data-sort-value="0.67" | 670 m || multiple || 2004–2021 || 09 Nov 2021 || 126 || align=left | Disc.: Spacewatch || 
|- id="2004 TN372" bgcolor=#d6d6d6
| 0 ||  || MBA-O || 16.71 || 2.5 km || multiple || 2004–2021 || 26 Nov 2021 || 112 || align=left | Disc.: Kitt Peak Obs. || 
|- id="2004 TQ372" bgcolor=#d6d6d6
| 0 ||  || MBA-O || 17.03 || 2.2 km || multiple || 2004–2022 || 25 Jan 2022 || 115 || align=left | Disc.: Spacewatch || 
|- id="2004 TR372" bgcolor=#fefefe
| 0 ||  || MBA-I || 17.9 || data-sort-value="0.78" | 780 m || multiple || 2004–2021 || 12 Jan 2021 || 77 || align=left | Disc.: Spacewatch || 
|- id="2004 TS372" bgcolor=#d6d6d6
| 1 ||  || MBA-O || 17.0 || 2.2 km || multiple || 2004–2021 || 18 Jan 2021 || 107 || align=left | Disc.: NEAT || 
|- id="2004 TT372" bgcolor=#fefefe
| 0 ||  || MBA-I || 18.2 || data-sort-value="0.68" | 680 m || multiple || 2004–2020 || 12 Dec 2020 || 128 || align=left | Disc.: Spacewatch || 
|- id="2004 TX372" bgcolor=#E9E9E9
| 0 ||  || MBA-M || 18.05 || data-sort-value="0.73" | 730 m || multiple || 2004–2022 || 25 Jan 2022 || 94 || align=left | Disc.: Spacewatch || 
|- id="2004 TY372" bgcolor=#fefefe
| 0 ||  || MBA-I || 18.28 || data-sort-value="0.66" | 660 m || multiple || 2004–2021 || 04 May 2021 || 90 || align=left | Disc.: Spacewatch || 
|- id="2004 TZ372" bgcolor=#fefefe
| 0 ||  || MBA-I || 17.82 || data-sort-value="0.81" | 810 m || multiple || 2000–2021 || 14 May 2021 || 92 || align=left | Disc.: Spacewatch || 
|- id="2004 TD373" bgcolor=#d6d6d6
| 0 ||  || MBA-O || 16.15 || 3.3 km || multiple || 2004–2021 || 12 Dec 2021 || 90 || align=left | Disc.: NEAT || 
|- id="2004 TE373" bgcolor=#d6d6d6
| 0 ||  || MBA-O || 16.1 || 3.4 km || multiple || 2004–2020 || 07 Dec 2020 || 103 || align=left | Disc.: Spacewatch || 
|- id="2004 TF373" bgcolor=#E9E9E9
| 0 ||  || MBA-M || 17.31 || 1.9 km || multiple || 2004–2021 || 14 May 2021 || 101 || align=left | Disc.: Spacewatch || 
|- id="2004 TJ373" bgcolor=#fefefe
| 0 ||  || MBA-I || 17.74 || data-sort-value="0.84" | 840 m || multiple || 2003–2021 || 14 Apr 2021 || 117 || align=left | Disc.: SpacewatchAlt.: 2003 HV13 || 
|- id="2004 TM373" bgcolor=#fefefe
| 0 ||  || MBA-I || 18.07 || data-sort-value="0.72" | 720 m || multiple || 2004–2021 || 15 Apr 2021 || 100 || align=left | Disc.: Spacewatch || 
|- id="2004 TN373" bgcolor=#fefefe
| 1 ||  || HUN || 18.2 || data-sort-value="0.68" | 680 m || multiple || 2004–2019 || 27 Jan 2019 || 56 || align=left | Disc.: NEAT || 
|- id="2004 TP373" bgcolor=#E9E9E9
| 0 ||  || MBA-M || 17.17 || 1.5 km || multiple || 2004–2021 || 02 Dec 2021 || 102 || align=left | Disc.: NEAT || 
|- id="2004 TS373" bgcolor=#fefefe
| 0 ||  || MBA-I || 18.15 || data-sort-value="0.70" | 700 m || multiple || 2004–2021 || 15 Apr 2021 || 81 || align=left | Disc.: Kitt Peak Obs. || 
|- id="2004 TT373" bgcolor=#d6d6d6
| 0 ||  || MBA-O || 16.72 || 2.5 km || multiple || 1993–2021 || 07 Nov 2021 || 81 || align=left | Disc.: Spacewatch || 
|- id="2004 TV373" bgcolor=#E9E9E9
| 0 ||  || MBA-M || 18.23 || data-sort-value="0.95" | 950 m || multiple || 2004–2021 || 24 Nov 2021 || 87 || align=left | Disc.: Spacewatch || 
|- id="2004 TW373" bgcolor=#E9E9E9
| 0 ||  || MBA-M || 17.89 || 1.1 km || multiple || 2004–2021 || 10 Oct 2021 || 101 || align=left | Disc.: Spacewatch || 
|- id="2004 TX373" bgcolor=#E9E9E9
| 0 ||  || MBA-M || 17.90 || 1.1 km || multiple || 2004–2021 || 08 Nov 2021 || 118 || align=left | Disc.: Spacewatch || 
|- id="2004 TY373" bgcolor=#fefefe
| 0 ||  || MBA-I || 18.1 || data-sort-value="0.71" | 710 m || multiple || 2002–2021 || 08 Jun 2021 || 96 || align=left | Disc.: Spacewatch || 
|- id="2004 TZ373" bgcolor=#FA8072
| 0 ||  || MCA || 18.1 || data-sort-value="0.71" | 710 m || multiple || 2004–2020 || 25 May 2020 || 89 || align=left | Disc.: Spacewatch || 
|- id="2004 TC374" bgcolor=#d6d6d6
| 0 ||  || MBA-O || 17.25 || 2.0 km || multiple || 2004–2021 || 14 Apr 2021 || 123 || align=left | Disc.: SpacewatchAlt.: 2016 BR79 || 
|- id="2004 TD374" bgcolor=#E9E9E9
| 0 ||  || MBA-M || 17.18 || 2.0 km || multiple || 2003–2021 || 10 May 2021 || 82 || align=left | Disc.: Kitt Peak Obs. || 
|- id="2004 TE374" bgcolor=#d6d6d6
| 0 ||  || MBA-O || 16.80 || 2.4 km || multiple || 2004–2021 || 01 Nov 2021 || 100 || align=left | Disc.: Spacewatch || 
|- id="2004 TG374" bgcolor=#E9E9E9
| 0 ||  || MBA-M || 17.33 || 1.9 km || multiple || 2004–2021 || 11 Jun 2021 || 84 || align=left | Disc.: Spacewatch || 
|- id="2004 TH374" bgcolor=#fefefe
| 0 ||  || MBA-I || 18.90 || data-sort-value="0.49" | 490 m || multiple || 2004–2021 || 16 May 2021 || 185 || align=left | Disc.: Spacewatch || 
|- id="2004 TK374" bgcolor=#fefefe
| 0 ||  || MBA-I || 18.4 || data-sort-value="0.62" | 620 m || multiple || 2004–2020 || 26 Jan 2020 || 59 || align=left | Disc.: Spacewatch || 
|- id="2004 TL374" bgcolor=#E9E9E9
| 1 ||  || MBA-M || 17.5 || 1.8 km || multiple || 2004–2020 || 20 Apr 2020 || 56 || align=left | Disc.: Spacewatch || 
|- id="2004 TM374" bgcolor=#d6d6d6
| 0 ||  || MBA-O || 16.22 || 3.2 km || multiple || 2004–2022 || 25 Jan 2022 || 135 || align=left | Disc.: Spacewatch || 
|- id="2004 TN374" bgcolor=#d6d6d6
| 0 ||  || MBA-O || 16.08 || 3.4 km || multiple || 2004–2021 || 07 Aug 2021 || 80 || align=left | Disc.: SpacewatchAlt.: 2010 MN30 || 
|- id="2004 TO374" bgcolor=#fefefe
| 0 ||  || MBA-I || 18.25 || data-sort-value="0.67" | 670 m || multiple || 2004–2021 || 03 May 2021 || 72 || align=left | Disc.: Spacewatch || 
|- id="2004 TP374" bgcolor=#fefefe
| 0 ||  || MBA-I || 18.30 || data-sort-value="0.65" | 650 m || multiple || 2004–2021 || 15 May 2021 || 88 || align=left | Disc.: Kitt Peak Obs. || 
|- id="2004 TQ374" bgcolor=#fefefe
| 0 ||  || MBA-I || 18.7 || data-sort-value="0.54" | 540 m || multiple || 2004–2020 || 17 Oct 2020 || 98 || align=left | Disc.: Spacewatch || 
|- id="2004 TR374" bgcolor=#d6d6d6
| 0 ||  || MBA-O || 16.09 || 3.4 km || multiple || 2004–2021 || 27 Nov 2021 || 92 || align=left | Disc.: Spacewatch || 
|- id="2004 TT374" bgcolor=#E9E9E9
| 0 ||  || MBA-M || 17.5 || 1.8 km || multiple || 2004–2017 || 12 Sep 2017 || 62 || align=left | Disc.: Spacewatch || 
|- id="2004 TU374" bgcolor=#d6d6d6
| 0 ||  || MBA-O || 16.66 || 2.6 km || multiple || 2004–2022 || 27 Jan 2022 || 140 || align=left | Disc.: Spacewatch || 
|- id="2004 TV374" bgcolor=#fefefe
| 0 ||  || MBA-I || 18.27 || data-sort-value="0.66" | 660 m || multiple || 2004–2021 || 12 Aug 2021 || 110 || align=left | Disc.: SpacewatchAlt.: 2016 BF80 || 
|- id="2004 TW374" bgcolor=#fefefe
| 0 ||  || MBA-I || 18.60 || data-sort-value="0.57" | 570 m || multiple || 2004–2021 || 08 Aug 2021 || 86 || align=left | Disc.: Spacewatch || 
|- id="2004 TZ374" bgcolor=#d6d6d6
| 1 ||  || MBA-O || 16.8 || 2.4 km || multiple || 2004–2019 || 01 Nov 2019 || 68 || align=left | Disc.: Spacewatch || 
|- id="2004 TB375" bgcolor=#fefefe
| 0 ||  || MBA-I || 18.20 || data-sort-value="0.68" | 680 m || multiple || 2004–2021 || 30 Jul 2021 || 145 || align=left | Disc.: SpacewatchAlt.: 2010 LL5 || 
|- id="2004 TC375" bgcolor=#fefefe
| 0 ||  || MBA-I || 18.15 || data-sort-value="0.70" | 700 m || multiple || 2004–2021 || 07 Apr 2021 || 49 || align=left | Disc.: Spacewatch || 
|- id="2004 TD375" bgcolor=#E9E9E9
| 0 ||  || MBA-M || 16.7 || 1.9 km || multiple || 2004–2021 || 11 Sep 2021 || 94 || align=left | Disc.: NEATAlt.: 2010 JG11 || 
|- id="2004 TG375" bgcolor=#fefefe
| 0 ||  || MBA-I || 17.70 || data-sort-value="0.86" | 860 m || multiple || 2003–2021 || 10 Aug 2021 || 125 || align=left | Disc.: SpacewatchAlt.: 2010 AG126, 2010 MB143 || 
|- id="2004 TH375" bgcolor=#fefefe
| 0 ||  || MBA-I || 18.2 || data-sort-value="0.68" | 680 m || multiple || 2004–2020 || 15 Feb 2020 || 60 || align=left | Disc.: Spacewatch || 
|- id="2004 TJ375" bgcolor=#fefefe
| 0 ||  || MBA-I || 18.59 || data-sort-value="0.57" | 570 m || multiple || 2004–2021 || 15 Apr 2021 || 50 || align=left | Disc.: Spacewatch || 
|- id="2004 TK375" bgcolor=#E9E9E9
| 0 ||  || MBA-M || 17.77 || 1.2 km || multiple || 2004–2021 || 06 Nov 2021 || 70 || align=left | Disc.: Spacewatch || 
|- id="2004 TL375" bgcolor=#E9E9E9
| 0 ||  || MBA-M || 17.76 || 1.2 km || multiple || 2003–2017 || 26 Oct 2017 || 50 || align=left | Disc.: Spacewatch || 
|- id="2004 TN375" bgcolor=#fefefe
| 1 ||  || MBA-I || 18.7 || data-sort-value="0.54" | 540 m || multiple || 2004–2020 || 26 Jan 2020 || 47 || align=left | Disc.: Spacewatch || 
|- id="2004 TO375" bgcolor=#d6d6d6
| 0 ||  || MBA-O || 16.92 || 2.3 km || multiple || 2004–2022 || 24 Jan 2022 || 98 || align=left | Disc.: Spacewatch || 
|- id="2004 TP375" bgcolor=#d6d6d6
| 0 ||  || MBA-O || 16.3 || 3.1 km || multiple || 2004–2020 || 21 Oct 2020 || 82 || align=left | Disc.: Spacewatch || 
|- id="2004 TR375" bgcolor=#fefefe
| 0 ||  || MBA-I || 18.2 || data-sort-value="0.68" | 680 m || multiple || 2004–2020 || 25 Jan 2020 || 52 || align=left | Disc.: Spacewatch || 
|- id="2004 TT375" bgcolor=#fefefe
| 0 ||  || MBA-I || 18.2 || data-sort-value="0.68" | 680 m || multiple || 2004–2020 || 01 Feb 2020 || 65 || align=left | Disc.: Spacewatch || 
|- id="2004 TU375" bgcolor=#d6d6d6
| 0 ||  || MBA-O || 16.3 || 3.1 km || multiple || 2004–2020 || 11 Dec 2020 || 114 || align=left | Disc.: Kitt Peak Obs. || 
|- id="2004 TV375" bgcolor=#E9E9E9
| 0 ||  || MBA-M || 17.64 || 1.2 km || multiple || 2004–2021 || 03 Oct 2021 || 70 || align=left | Disc.: Spacewatch || 
|- id="2004 TW375" bgcolor=#fefefe
| 0 ||  || MBA-I || 18.1 || data-sort-value="0.71" | 710 m || multiple || 2004–2019 || 19 Dec 2019 || 73 || align=left | Disc.: Spacewatch || 
|- id="2004 TX375" bgcolor=#E9E9E9
| 0 ||  || MBA-M || 17.83 || 1.1 km || multiple || 2002–2021 || 05 Oct 2021 || 106 || align=left | Disc.: SpacewatchAlt.: 2002 DW11 || 
|- id="2004 TY375" bgcolor=#E9E9E9
| 0 ||  || MBA-M || 17.93 || data-sort-value="0.77" | 770 m || multiple || 2004–2021 || 27 Nov 2021 || 115 || align=left | Disc.: Spacewatch || 
|- id="2004 TZ375" bgcolor=#E9E9E9
| 0 ||  || MBA-M || 18.02 || 1.0 km || multiple || 2004–2021 || 13 Sep 2021 || 47 || align=left | Disc.: Spacewatch || 
|- id="2004 TC376" bgcolor=#d6d6d6
| 0 ||  || MBA-O || 16.3 || 3.1 km || multiple || 2001–2020 || 16 May 2020 || 59 || align=left | Disc.: Spacewatch || 
|- id="2004 TD376" bgcolor=#E9E9E9
| 0 ||  || MBA-M || 17.75 || 1.2 km || multiple || 2004–2021 || 09 Nov 2021 || 78 || align=left | Disc.: Kitt Peak Obs. || 
|- id="2004 TE376" bgcolor=#fefefe
| 0 ||  || MBA-I || 18.5 || data-sort-value="0.59" | 590 m || multiple || 2004–2019 || 27 Oct 2019 || 79 || align=left | Disc.: Spacewatch || 
|- id="2004 TK376" bgcolor=#E9E9E9
| 0 ||  || MBA-M || 17.88 || 1.1 km || multiple || 2004–2021 || 08 Oct 2021 || 65 || align=left | Disc.: Spacewatch || 
|- id="2004 TL376" bgcolor=#E9E9E9
| 1 ||  || MBA-M || 17.6 || 1.7 km || multiple || 2004–2019 || 11 Feb 2019 || 62 || align=left | Disc.: SpacewatchAlt.: 2010 FR110 || 
|- id="2004 TM376" bgcolor=#E9E9E9
| 1 ||  || MBA-M || 18.1 || data-sort-value="0.71" | 710 m || multiple || 2004–2020 || 10 Oct 2020 || 102 || align=left | Disc.: Spacewatch || 
|- id="2004 TN376" bgcolor=#fefefe
| 0 ||  || MBA-I || 18.44 || data-sort-value="0.61" | 610 m || multiple || 2004–2021 || 07 Apr 2021 || 52 || align=left | Disc.: Kitt Peak Obs. || 
|- id="2004 TO376" bgcolor=#fefefe
| 0 ||  || MBA-I || 18.9 || data-sort-value="0.49" | 490 m || multiple || 2004–2020 || 05 Nov 2020 || 75 || align=left | Disc.: Spacewatch || 
|- id="2004 TQ376" bgcolor=#fefefe
| 0 ||  || MBA-I || 18.3 || data-sort-value="0.65" | 650 m || multiple || 2004–2017 || 21 Feb 2017 || 42 || align=left | Disc.: Spacewatch || 
|- id="2004 TR376" bgcolor=#fefefe
| 1 ||  || MBA-I || 18.9 || data-sort-value="0.49" | 490 m || multiple || 2004–2018 || 08 Nov 2018 || 36 || align=left | Disc.: Spacewatch || 
|- id="2004 TS376" bgcolor=#fefefe
| 0 ||  || MBA-I || 18.2 || data-sort-value="0.68" | 680 m || multiple || 2004–2019 || 29 Sep 2019 || 52 || align=left | Disc.: Spacewatch || 
|- id="2004 TU376" bgcolor=#E9E9E9
| 0 ||  || MBA-M || 17.74 || 1.2 km || multiple || 2004–2021 || 26 Oct 2021 || 70 || align=left | Disc.: Spacewatch || 
|- id="2004 TV376" bgcolor=#E9E9E9
| 0 ||  || MBA-M || 16.9 || 2.3 km || multiple || 1995–2021 || 15 Jun 2021 || 56 || align=left | Disc.: Spacewatch || 
|- id="2004 TC377" bgcolor=#fefefe
| 0 ||  || MBA-I || 17.9 || data-sort-value="0.78" | 780 m || multiple || 2004–2019 || 09 Jul 2019 || 80 || align=left | Disc.: Spacewatch || 
|- id="2004 TD377" bgcolor=#E9E9E9
| 0 ||  || MBA-M || 17.85 || 1.5 km || multiple || 2004–2021 || 10 Apr 2021 || 51 || align=left | Disc.: Spacewatch || 
|- id="2004 TE377" bgcolor=#E9E9E9
| 2 ||  || MBA-M || 19.0 || data-sort-value="0.47" | 470 m || multiple || 2004–2020 || 05 Nov 2020 || 73 || align=left | Disc.: Spacewatch || 
|- id="2004 TF377" bgcolor=#d6d6d6
| 0 ||  || MBA-O || 16.5 || 2.8 km || multiple || 2004–2021 || 09 Jan 2021 || 95 || align=left | Disc.: Spacewatch || 
|- id="2004 TG377" bgcolor=#fefefe
| 0 ||  || MBA-I || 18.44 || data-sort-value="0.61" | 610 m || multiple || 2004–2021 || 26 Oct 2021 || 97 || align=left | Disc.: Kitt Peak Obs. || 
|- id="2004 TJ377" bgcolor=#d6d6d6
| 2 ||  || MBA-O || 17.5 || 1.8 km || multiple || 2004–2019 || 03 Oct 2019 || 45 || align=left | Disc.: Spacewatch || 
|- id="2004 TK377" bgcolor=#E9E9E9
| 0 ||  || MBA-M || 17.8 || 1.2 km || multiple || 2004–2017 || 17 Nov 2017 || 38 || align=left | Disc.: Kitt Peak Obs. || 
|- id="2004 TL377" bgcolor=#E9E9E9
| 0 ||  || MBA-M || 17.9 || 1.5 km || multiple || 2004–2020 || 26 Mar 2020 || 34 || align=left | Disc.: Spacewatch || 
|- id="2004 TM377" bgcolor=#fefefe
| 0 ||  || MBA-I || 18.6 || data-sort-value="0.57" | 570 m || multiple || 2004–2021 || 11 May 2021 || 126 || align=left | Disc.: Kitt Peak Obs. || 
|- id="2004 TO377" bgcolor=#E9E9E9
| 0 ||  || MBA-M || 17.82 || 1.1 km || multiple || 2004–2021 || 06 Oct 2021 || 68 || align=left | Disc.: Spacewatch || 
|- id="2004 TQ377" bgcolor=#fefefe
| 2 ||  || MBA-I || 18.4 || data-sort-value="0.62" | 620 m || multiple || 2004–2021 || 17 Jan 2021 || 39 || align=left | Disc.: Spacewatch || 
|- id="2004 TR377" bgcolor=#E9E9E9
| 0 ||  || MBA-M || 17.42 || 1.4 km || multiple || 2004–2021 || 24 Nov 2021 || 91 || align=left | Disc.: Spacewatch || 
|- id="2004 TS377" bgcolor=#d6d6d6
| 0 ||  || MBA-O || 17.2 || 2.0 km || multiple || 2004–2019 || 26 Sep 2019 || 47 || align=left | Disc.: Spacewatch || 
|- id="2004 TT377" bgcolor=#fefefe
| 1 ||  || MBA-I || 18.9 || data-sort-value="0.49" | 490 m || multiple || 2004–2020 || 25 Jan 2020 || 38 || align=left | Disc.: Kitt Peak Obs. || 
|- id="2004 TU377" bgcolor=#fefefe
| 0 ||  || MBA-I || 18.26 || data-sort-value="0.66" | 660 m || multiple || 2004–2021 || 28 Nov 2021 || 99 || align=left | Disc.: LPL/Spacewatch II || 
|- id="2004 TV377" bgcolor=#E9E9E9
| 0 ||  || MBA-M || 18.0 || data-sort-value="0.75" | 750 m || multiple || 2004–2020 || 11 Aug 2020 || 63 || align=left | Disc.: Apache Point || 
|- id="2004 TW377" bgcolor=#fefefe
| 0 ||  || MBA-I || 19.0 || data-sort-value="0.47" | 470 m || multiple || 2004–2020 || 23 May 2020 || 33 || align=left | Disc.: Spacewatch || 
|- id="2004 TX377" bgcolor=#E9E9E9
| 0 ||  || MBA-M || 18.14 || data-sort-value="0.99" | 990 m || multiple || 2002–2021 || 04 Oct 2021 || 47 || align=left | Disc.: Kitt Peak Obs. || 
|- id="2004 TZ377" bgcolor=#d6d6d6
| 0 ||  || MBA-O || 17.18 || 2.0 km || multiple || 2004–2021 || 07 Nov 2021 || 75 || align=left | Disc.: Kitt Peak Obs.Alt.: 2010 OS65 || 
|- id="2004 TA378" bgcolor=#E9E9E9
| 0 ||  || MBA-M || 17.88 || 1.1 km || multiple || 2002–2021 || 10 Dec 2021 || 118 || align=left | Disc.: Spacewatch || 
|- id="2004 TB378" bgcolor=#d6d6d6
| 0 ||  || MBA-O || 17.86 || 1.5 km || multiple || 2004–2021 || 21 Apr 2021 || 48 || align=left | Disc.: Kitt Peak Obs. || 
|- id="2004 TC378" bgcolor=#E9E9E9
| 0 ||  || MBA-M || 17.2 || 1.5 km || multiple || 2004–2020 || 21 Jun 2020 || 38 || align=left | Disc.: Kitt Peak Obs. || 
|- id="2004 TD378" bgcolor=#E9E9E9
| 1 ||  || MBA-M || 17.65 || 1.6 km || multiple || 2004–2021 || 17 May 2021 || 210 || align=left | Disc.: Kitt Peak Obs. || 
|- id="2004 TE378" bgcolor=#E9E9E9
| 0 ||  || MBA-M || 18.27 || data-sort-value="0.93" | 930 m || multiple || 2004–2021 || 27 Oct 2021 || 88 || align=left | Disc.: Spacewatch || 
|- id="2004 TF378" bgcolor=#fefefe
| 0 ||  || MBA-I || 18.3 || data-sort-value="0.65" | 650 m || multiple || 2004–2019 || 19 Dec 2019 || 31 || align=left | Disc.: LPL/Spacewatch II || 
|- id="2004 TJ378" bgcolor=#E9E9E9
| 0 ||  || MBA-M || 17.47 || 1.8 km || multiple || 2004–2021 || 22 May 2021 || 43 || align=left | Disc.: Spacewatch || 
|- id="2004 TK378" bgcolor=#E9E9E9
| 1 ||  || MBA-M || 17.4 || data-sort-value="0.98" | 980 m || multiple || 2004–2019 || 30 Jun 2019 || 28 || align=left | Disc.: Spacewatch || 
|- id="2004 TL378" bgcolor=#E9E9E9
| 0 ||  || MBA-M || 17.84 || 1.1 km || multiple || 2004–2022 || 08 Jan 2022 || 85 || align=left | Disc.: NEAT || 
|- id="2004 TM378" bgcolor=#E9E9E9
| 0 ||  || MBA-M || 18.39 || data-sort-value="0.88" | 880 m || multiple || 2004–2021 || 09 Nov 2021 || 63 || align=left | Disc.: Kitt Peak Obs. || 
|- id="2004 TN378" bgcolor=#d6d6d6
| 0 ||  || MBA-O || 17.50 || 1.8 km || multiple || 2004–2022 || 26 Jan 2022 || 77 || align=left | Disc.: Molėtai Obs. || 
|- id="2004 TO378" bgcolor=#E9E9E9
| 1 ||  || MBA-M || 18.50 || data-sort-value="0.84" | 840 m || multiple || 2004–2021 || 11 Sep 2021 || 45 || align=left | Disc.: MLS || 
|- id="2004 TP378" bgcolor=#E9E9E9
| 1 ||  || MBA-M || 17.7 || data-sort-value="0.86" | 860 m || multiple || 2004–2020 || 15 Sep 2020 || 36 || align=left | Disc.: Spacewatch || 
|- id="2004 TQ378" bgcolor=#E9E9E9
| 1 ||  || MBA-M || 17.77 || 1.6 km || multiple || 2004–2021 || 08 May 2021 || 35 || align=left | Disc.: Spacewatch || 
|- id="2004 TR378" bgcolor=#E9E9E9
| 0 ||  || MBA-M || 16.85 || 2.4 km || multiple || 2004–2021 || 15 Apr 2021 || 116 || align=left | Disc.: Spacewatch || 
|- id="2004 TS378" bgcolor=#fefefe
| 0 ||  || MBA-I || 18.1 || data-sort-value="0.71" | 710 m || multiple || 2004–2019 || 20 Dec 2019 || 81 || align=left | Disc.: Spacewatch || 
|- id="2004 TT378" bgcolor=#fefefe
| 0 ||  || MBA-I || 17.83 || data-sort-value="0.81" | 810 m || multiple || 2004–2021 || 03 Apr 2021 || 103 || align=left | Disc.: NEAT || 
|- id="2004 TU378" bgcolor=#fefefe
| 0 ||  || MBA-I || 18.1 || data-sort-value="0.71" | 710 m || multiple || 2004–2019 || 01 Nov 2019 || 74 || align=left | Disc.: Kitt Peak Obs. || 
|- id="2004 TV378" bgcolor=#E9E9E9
| 0 ||  || MBA-M || 17.55 || 1.7 km || multiple || 2004–2021 || 09 Apr 2021 || 95 || align=left | Disc.: Spacewatch || 
|- id="2004 TW378" bgcolor=#E9E9E9
| 0 ||  || MBA-M || 17.5 || 1.8 km || multiple || 1995–2020 || 24 Jun 2020 || 93 || align=left | Disc.: Spacewatch || 
|- id="2004 TX378" bgcolor=#E9E9E9
| 0 ||  || MBA-M || 17.36 || 1.4 km || multiple || 2001–2021 || 28 Sep 2021 || 79 || align=left | Disc.: Spacewatch || 
|- id="2004 TY378" bgcolor=#fefefe
| 0 ||  || MBA-I || 18.10 || data-sort-value="0.71" | 710 m || multiple || 2004–2021 || 08 Apr 2021 || 80 || align=left | Disc.: Spacewatch || 
|- id="2004 TZ378" bgcolor=#d6d6d6
| 0 ||  || MBA-O || 17.0 || 2.2 km || multiple || 2004–2020 || 17 Oct 2020 || 107 || align=left | Disc.: Spacewatch || 
|- id="2004 TA379" bgcolor=#fefefe
| 0 ||  || MBA-I || 18.0 || data-sort-value="0.75" | 750 m || multiple || 2004–2019 || 21 Sep 2019 || 61 || align=left | Disc.: Spacewatch || 
|- id="2004 TB379" bgcolor=#d6d6d6
| 0 ||  || MBA-O || 16.48 || 2.8 km || multiple || 2004–2021 || 07 Nov 2021 || 114 || align=left | Disc.: Spacewatch || 
|- id="2004 TC379" bgcolor=#fefefe
| 1 ||  || MBA-I || 18.1 || data-sort-value="0.71" | 710 m || multiple || 2004–2019 || 03 Jan 2019 || 77 || align=left | Disc.: Spacewatch || 
|- id="2004 TE379" bgcolor=#d6d6d6
| 0 ||  || MBA-O || 16.8 || 2.4 km || multiple || 2004–2020 || 16 Nov 2020 || 65 || align=left | Disc.: Spacewatch || 
|- id="2004 TF379" bgcolor=#E9E9E9
| 0 ||  || MBA-M || 16.93 || 2.3 km || multiple || 1995–2021 || 11 May 2021 || 98 || align=left | Disc.: Spacewatch || 
|- id="2004 TG379" bgcolor=#d6d6d6
| 0 ||  || MBA-O || 16.6 || 2.7 km || multiple || 2004–2020 || 16 Dec 2020 || 73 || align=left | Disc.: MLS || 
|- id="2004 TJ379" bgcolor=#fefefe
| 2 ||  || MBA-I || 18.6 || data-sort-value="0.57" | 570 m || multiple || 2004–2019 || 03 Jan 2019 || 54 || align=left | Disc.: Spacewatch || 
|- id="2004 TK379" bgcolor=#d6d6d6
| 0 ||  || MBA-O || 16.9 || 2.3 km || multiple || 2004–2020 || 14 Dec 2020 || 72 || align=left | Disc.: Spacewatch || 
|- id="2004 TL379" bgcolor=#E9E9E9
| 0 ||  || MBA-M || 17.51 || 1.3 km || multiple || 2004–2021 || 28 Sep 2021 || 94 || align=left | Disc.: Spacewatch || 
|- id="2004 TM379" bgcolor=#E9E9E9
| 0 ||  || MBA-M || 17.3 || 1.9 km || multiple || 2004–2021 || 07 Jun 2021 || 69 || align=left | Disc.: NEAT || 
|- id="2004 TN379" bgcolor=#E9E9E9
| 0 ||  || MBA-M || 17.0 || 2.2 km || multiple || 2004–2020 || 19 Apr 2020 || 93 || align=left | Disc.: Spacewatch || 
|- id="2004 TO379" bgcolor=#d6d6d6
| 0 ||  || MBA-O || 17.1 || 2.1 km || multiple || 2004–2020 || 17 Dec 2020 || 58 || align=left | Disc.: Spacewatch || 
|- id="2004 TP379" bgcolor=#fefefe
| 0 ||  || MBA-I || 18.2 || data-sort-value="0.68" | 680 m || multiple || 2004–2019 || 30 Nov 2019 || 81 || align=left | Disc.: SpacewatchAlt.: 2013 BU34 || 
|- id="2004 TS379" bgcolor=#fefefe
| 0 ||  || MBA-I || 18.72 || data-sort-value="0.54" | 540 m || multiple || 2004–2021 || 08 May 2021 || 60 || align=left | Disc.: Kitt Peak Obs. || 
|- id="2004 TT379" bgcolor=#d6d6d6
| 0 ||  || MBA-O || 17.0 || 2.2 km || multiple || 2004–2021 || 17 Jan 2021 || 87 || align=left | Disc.: SpacewatchAlt.: 2014 SA369 || 
|- id="2004 TU379" bgcolor=#d6d6d6
| 0 ||  || MBA-O || 16.34 || 3.0 km || multiple || 1998–2021 || 24 Nov 2021 || 93 || align=left | Disc.: Spacewatch || 
|- id="2004 TW379" bgcolor=#fefefe
| 0 ||  || MBA-I || 17.9 || data-sort-value="0.78" | 780 m || multiple || 2004–2019 || 24 Oct 2019 || 55 || align=left | Disc.: Spacewatch || 
|- id="2004 TX379" bgcolor=#fefefe
| 0 ||  || MBA-I || 18.23 || data-sort-value="0.67" | 670 m || multiple || 2004–2021 || 14 Apr 2021 || 63 || align=left | Disc.: Spacewatch || 
|- id="2004 TY379" bgcolor=#E9E9E9
| 0 ||  || MBA-M || 17.42 || 1.8 km || multiple || 2004–2021 || 10 Apr 2021 || 63 || align=left | Disc.: MLS || 
|- id="2004 TZ379" bgcolor=#fefefe
| 0 ||  || MBA-I || 19.1 || data-sort-value="0.45" | 450 m || multiple || 2004–2019 || 27 Oct 2019 || 47 || align=left | Disc.: Spacewatch || 
|- id="2004 TA380" bgcolor=#fefefe
| 1 ||  || MBA-I || 18.4 || data-sort-value="0.62" | 620 m || multiple || 2004–2019 || 02 Nov 2019 || 46 || align=left | Disc.: Spacewatch || 
|- id="2004 TB380" bgcolor=#E9E9E9
| 0 ||  || MBA-M || 17.80 || 1.5 km || multiple || 2004–2021 || 07 Apr 2021 || 59 || align=left | Disc.: Spacewatch || 
|- id="2004 TC380" bgcolor=#E9E9E9
| 1 ||  || MBA-M || 17.7 || 1.6 km || multiple || 2004–2018 || 08 Nov 2018 || 48 || align=left | Disc.: Spacewatch || 
|- id="2004 TD380" bgcolor=#d6d6d6
| 0 ||  || MBA-O || 16.91 || 2.3 km || multiple || 2004–2022 || 27 Jan 2022 || 60 || align=left | Disc.: Spacewatch || 
|- id="2004 TE380" bgcolor=#fefefe
| 0 ||  || MBA-I || 18.6 || data-sort-value="0.57" | 570 m || multiple || 2004–2019 || 25 Sep 2019 || 65 || align=left | Disc.: Spacewatch || 
|- id="2004 TG380" bgcolor=#fefefe
| 0 ||  || MBA-I || 19.0 || data-sort-value="0.47" | 470 m || multiple || 2004–2019 || 26 Oct 2019 || 44 || align=left | Disc.: Spacewatch || 
|- id="2004 TH380" bgcolor=#fefefe
| 0 ||  || MBA-I || 18.4 || data-sort-value="0.62" | 620 m || multiple || 2004–2018 || 12 Nov 2018 || 45 || align=left | Disc.: Spacewatch || 
|- id="2004 TJ380" bgcolor=#fefefe
| 0 ||  || MBA-I || 17.8 || data-sort-value="0.82" | 820 m || multiple || 2004–2020 || 22 Dec 2020 || 45 || align=left | Disc.: Spacewatch || 
|- id="2004 TL380" bgcolor=#fefefe
| 0 ||  || MBA-I || 18.0 || data-sort-value="0.75" | 750 m || multiple || 2004–2019 || 27 Oct 2019 || 39 || align=left | Disc.: Kitt Peak Obs. || 
|- id="2004 TM380" bgcolor=#fefefe
| 2 ||  || MBA-I || 18.8 || data-sort-value="0.52" | 520 m || multiple || 2004–2018 || 06 Oct 2018 || 41 || align=left | Disc.: Kitt Peak Obs. || 
|- id="2004 TN380" bgcolor=#fefefe
| 0 ||  || MBA-I || 19.2 || data-sort-value="0.43" | 430 m || multiple || 2004–2019 || 26 Nov 2019 || 56 || align=left | Disc.: MLS || 
|- id="2004 TP380" bgcolor=#E9E9E9
| 0 ||  || MBA-M || 17.98 || 1.1 km || multiple || 2004–2021 || 11 Oct 2021 || 48 || align=left | Disc.: Kitt Peak Obs. || 
|- id="2004 TQ380" bgcolor=#E9E9E9
| 0 ||  || MBA-M || 18.1 || 1.3 km || multiple || 2004–2018 || 11 Nov 2018 || 45 || align=left | Disc.: Spacewatch || 
|- id="2004 TR380" bgcolor=#E9E9E9
| 0 ||  || MBA-M || 17.4 || 1.8 km || multiple || 2004–2021 || 09 May 2021 || 65 || align=left | Disc.: Spacewatch || 
|- id="2004 TS380" bgcolor=#FA8072
| 2 ||  || MCA || 19.2 || data-sort-value="0.43" | 430 m || multiple || 2004–2019 || 28 May 2019 || 45 || align=left | Disc.: Kitt Peak Obs. || 
|- id="2004 TT380" bgcolor=#fefefe
| 0 ||  || MBA-I || 18.56 || data-sort-value="0.58" | 580 m || multiple || 2004–2021 || 04 May 2021 || 52 || align=left | Disc.: Spacewatch || 
|- id="2004 TU380" bgcolor=#E9E9E9
| 0 ||  || MBA-M || 17.64 || 1.7 km || multiple || 2004–2021 || 09 Jun 2021 || 50 || align=left | Disc.: Kitt Peak Obs. || 
|- id="2004 TV380" bgcolor=#d6d6d6
| 0 ||  || MBA-O || 17.2 || 2.0 km || multiple || 2004–2020 || 17 Oct 2020 || 65 || align=left | Disc.: Spacewatch || 
|- id="2004 TW380" bgcolor=#d6d6d6
| 2 ||  || MBA-O || 17.4 || 1.8 km || multiple || 2004–2020 || 10 Dec 2020 || 45 || align=left | Disc.: LPL/Spacewatch II || 
|- id="2004 TX380" bgcolor=#fefefe
| 0 ||  || MBA-I || 19.0 || data-sort-value="0.47" | 470 m || multiple || 2004–2019 || 28 Nov 2019 || 54 || align=left | Disc.: SpacewatchAlt.: 2013 AL177 || 
|- id="2004 TZ380" bgcolor=#d6d6d6
| 0 ||  || MBA-O || 16.84 || 2.4 km || multiple || 2004–2021 || 12 Aug 2021 || 38 || align=left | Disc.: Kitt Peak Obs. || 
|- id="2004 TA381" bgcolor=#E9E9E9
| 0 ||  || MBA-M || 17.4 || 1.8 km || multiple || 2004–2018 || 07 Sep 2018 || 37 || align=left | Disc.: Spacewatch || 
|- id="2004 TB381" bgcolor=#fefefe
| 0 ||  || HUN || 18.2 || data-sort-value="0.68" | 680 m || multiple || 2004–2020 || 09 Dec 2020 || 106 || align=left | Disc.: Spacewatch || 
|- id="2004 TC381" bgcolor=#fefefe
| 0 ||  || MBA-I || 18.6 || data-sort-value="0.57" | 570 m || multiple || 2004–2020 || 22 Jan 2020 || 48 || align=left | Disc.: Spacewatch || 
|- id="2004 TD381" bgcolor=#E9E9E9
| 0 ||  || MBA-M || 17.39 || data-sort-value="0.99" | 990 m || multiple || 2004–2021 || 13 Dec 2021 || 46 || align=left | Disc.: Spacewatch || 
|- id="2004 TE381" bgcolor=#E9E9E9
| 0 ||  || MBA-M || 17.8 || 1.5 km || multiple || 2004–2019 || 09 Feb 2019 || 55 || align=left | Disc.: Kitt Peak Obs.Alt.: 2010 JJ63 || 
|- id="2004 TG381" bgcolor=#fefefe
| 1 ||  || MBA-I || 18.4 || data-sort-value="0.62" | 620 m || multiple || 1993–2018 || 04 Oct 2018 || 46 || align=left | Disc.: Spacewatch || 
|- id="2004 TJ381" bgcolor=#fefefe
| 0 ||  || MBA-I || 18.9 || data-sort-value="0.49" | 490 m || multiple || 2004–2019 || 28 Nov 2019 || 34 || align=left | Disc.: Spacewatch || 
|- id="2004 TL381" bgcolor=#E9E9E9
| 0 ||  || MBA-M || 17.4 || 1.8 km || multiple || 2004–2020 || 12 May 2020 || 65 || align=left | Disc.: MLS || 
|- id="2004 TM381" bgcolor=#d6d6d6
| 2 ||  || MBA-O || 17.6 || 1.7 km || multiple || 2004–2019 || 02 Nov 2019 || 41 || align=left | Disc.: Spacewatch || 
|- id="2004 TN381" bgcolor=#fefefe
| 1 ||  || MBA-I || 19.1 || data-sort-value="0.45" | 450 m || multiple || 2004–2019 || 02 Nov 2019 || 39 || align=left | Disc.: Spacewatch || 
|- id="2004 TO381" bgcolor=#fefefe
| 0 ||  || MBA-I || 18.4 || data-sort-value="0.62" | 620 m || multiple || 2004–2020 || 18 Aug 2020 || 66 || align=left | Disc.: Spacewatch || 
|- id="2004 TP381" bgcolor=#fefefe
| 0 ||  || MBA-I || 19.0 || data-sort-value="0.47" | 470 m || multiple || 2004–2019 || 01 Nov 2019 || 36 || align=left | Disc.: Spacewatch || 
|- id="2004 TQ381" bgcolor=#d6d6d6
| 2 ||  || MBA-O || 17.7 || 1.6 km || multiple || 1994–2019 || 02 Nov 2019 || 42 || align=left | Disc.: Spacewatch || 
|- id="2004 TR381" bgcolor=#E9E9E9
| 0 ||  || MBA-M || 17.4 || 1.8 km || multiple || 2004–2020 || 23 Jan 2020 || 43 || align=left | Disc.: Spacewatch || 
|- id="2004 TS381" bgcolor=#E9E9E9
| 0 ||  || MBA-M || 18.0 || 1.4 km || multiple || 2004–2020 || 27 Apr 2020 || 46 || align=left | Disc.: MLS || 
|- id="2004 TT381" bgcolor=#fefefe
| 1 ||  || MBA-I || 19.1 || data-sort-value="0.45" | 450 m || multiple || 2004–2018 || 13 Aug 2018 || 31 || align=left | Disc.: Spacewatch || 
|- id="2004 TU381" bgcolor=#E9E9E9
| 0 ||  || MBA-M || 18.45 || data-sort-value="0.61" | 610 m || multiple || 2004–2021 || 28 Nov 2021 || 35 || align=left | Disc.: Spacewatch || 
|- id="2004 TV381" bgcolor=#E9E9E9
| 0 ||  || MBA-M || 17.31 || 1.0 km || multiple || 2004–2021 || 01 Dec 2021 || 35 || align=left | Disc.: NEAT || 
|- id="2004 TW381" bgcolor=#fefefe
| 0 ||  || MBA-I || 18.6 || data-sort-value="0.57" | 570 m || multiple || 2004–2020 || 17 Dec 2020 || 43 || align=left | Disc.: Spacewatch || 
|- id="2004 TX381" bgcolor=#fefefe
| 1 ||  || MBA-I || 18.7 || data-sort-value="0.54" | 540 m || multiple || 2004–2021 || 14 Jun 2021 || 47 || align=left | Disc.: Spacewatch || 
|- id="2004 TY381" bgcolor=#d6d6d6
| 1 ||  || MBA-O || 16.8 || 2.4 km || multiple || 2004–2020 || 14 Dec 2020 || 51 || align=left | Disc.: Spacewatch || 
|- id="2004 TZ381" bgcolor=#fefefe
| 0 ||  || MBA-I || 18.40 || data-sort-value="0.62" | 620 m || multiple || 2004–2021 || 03 Dec 2021 || 107 || align=left | Disc.: SpacewatchAlt.: 2019 AM44 || 
|- id="2004 TA382" bgcolor=#fefefe
| 0 ||  || MBA-I || 18.2 || data-sort-value="0.68" | 680 m || multiple || 2004–2021 || 08 Jun 2021 || 72 || align=left | Disc.: Spacewatch || 
|- id="2004 TB382" bgcolor=#fefefe
| 3 ||  || MBA-I || 19.2 || data-sort-value="0.43" | 430 m || multiple || 2004–2019 || 27 Oct 2019 || 32 || align=left | Disc.: Spacewatch || 
|- id="2004 TC382" bgcolor=#fefefe
| 1 ||  || MBA-I || 19.2 || data-sort-value="0.43" | 430 m || multiple || 2004–2019 || 26 Oct 2019 || 25 || align=left | Disc.: Spacewatch || 
|- id="2004 TE382" bgcolor=#fefefe
| 0 ||  || MBA-I || 17.96 || data-sort-value="0.76" | 760 m || multiple || 2003–2021 || 11 May 2021 || 117 || align=left | Disc.: Cerro TololoAlt.: 2003 KK21 || 
|- id="2004 TF382" bgcolor=#fefefe
| 0 ||  || MBA-I || 18.0 || data-sort-value="0.75" | 750 m || multiple || 2004–2020 || 05 Nov 2020 || 158 || align=left | Disc.: Spacewatch || 
|- id="2004 TG382" bgcolor=#d6d6d6
| 0 ||  || MBA-O || 16.37 || 3.0 km || multiple || 2004–2021 || 07 Nov 2021 || 119 || align=left | Disc.: LPL/Spacewatch II || 
|- id="2004 TJ382" bgcolor=#E9E9E9
| 0 ||  || MBA-M || 17.63 || 1.3 km || multiple || 2004–2021 || 11 Oct 2021 || 153 || align=left | Disc.: Spacewatch || 
|- id="2004 TK382" bgcolor=#d6d6d6
| 0 ||  || MBA-O || 16.46 || 2.8 km || multiple || 2004–2021 || 16 Oct 2021 || 113 || align=left | Disc.: Spacewatch || 
|- id="2004 TM382" bgcolor=#fefefe
| 0 ||  || MBA-I || 18.36 || data-sort-value="0.63" | 630 m || multiple || 2004–2021 || 11 May 2021 || 84 || align=left | Disc.: Spacewatch || 
|- id="2004 TN382" bgcolor=#fefefe
| 0 ||  || MBA-I || 18.4 || data-sort-value="0.62" | 620 m || multiple || 2004–2019 || 03 Oct 2019 || 51 || align=left | Disc.: Spacewatch || 
|- id="2004 TO382" bgcolor=#fefefe
| 0 ||  || MBA-I || 18.4 || data-sort-value="0.62" | 620 m || multiple || 2004–2019 || 27 Oct 2019 || 48 || align=left | Disc.: Spacewatch || 
|- id="2004 TP382" bgcolor=#fefefe
| 0 ||  || MBA-I || 18.9 || data-sort-value="0.49" | 490 m || multiple || 2004–2019 || 04 Dec 2019 || 52 || align=left | Disc.: Kitt Peak Obs. || 
|- id="2004 TR382" bgcolor=#fefefe
| 0 ||  || MBA-I || 18.9 || data-sort-value="0.49" | 490 m || multiple || 2004–2020 || 15 Oct 2020 || 69 || align=left | Disc.: Spacewatch || 
|- id="2004 TS382" bgcolor=#d6d6d6
| 0 ||  || MBA-O || 16.9 || 2.3 km || multiple || 2004–2020 || 10 Aug 2020 || 38 || align=left | Disc.: Kitt Peak Obs. || 
|- id="2004 TU382" bgcolor=#fefefe
| 0 ||  || MBA-I || 19.3 || data-sort-value="0.41" | 410 m || multiple || 2004–2019 || 04 Dec 2019 || 43 || align=left | Disc.: Spacewatch || 
|- id="2004 TV382" bgcolor=#E9E9E9
| 0 ||  || MBA-M || 18.72 || data-sort-value="0.76" | 760 m || multiple || 2004–2021 || 30 Oct 2021 || 58 || align=left | Disc.: Spacewatch || 
|- id="2004 TW382" bgcolor=#d6d6d6
| 0 ||  || MBA-O || 17.39 || 1.9 km || multiple || 2004–2022 || 27 Jan 2022 || 78 || align=left | Disc.: Spacewatch || 
|- id="2004 TY382" bgcolor=#E9E9E9
| 0 ||  || MBA-M || 17.7 || 1.2 km || multiple || 2004–2020 || 27 Apr 2020 || 45 || align=left | Disc.: Spacewatch || 
|- id="2004 TZ382" bgcolor=#d6d6d6
| 0 ||  || MBA-O || 16.9 || 2.3 km || multiple || 2004–2019 || 01 May 2019 || 33 || align=left | Disc.: Kitt Peak Obs. || 
|- id="2004 TB383" bgcolor=#E9E9E9
| 1 ||  || MBA-M || 18.1 || data-sort-value="0.71" | 710 m || multiple || 2004–2020 || 14 Oct 2020 || 93 || align=left | Disc.: Spacewatch || 
|- id="2004 TD383" bgcolor=#fefefe
| 0 ||  || MBA-I || 19.05 || data-sort-value="0.46" | 460 m || multiple || 2004–2021 || 28 Nov 2021 || 50 || align=left | Disc.: Spacewatch || 
|- id="2004 TE383" bgcolor=#E9E9E9
| 0 ||  || MBA-M || 17.7 || 1.2 km || multiple || 2004–2017 || 07 Nov 2017 || 39 || align=left | Disc.: Spacewatch || 
|- id="2004 TF383" bgcolor=#d6d6d6
| 0 ||  || MBA-O || 17.2 || 2.0 km || multiple || 2004–2020 || 14 Oct 2020 || 62 || align=left | Disc.: Spacewatch || 
|- id="2004 TG383" bgcolor=#d6d6d6
| 0 ||  || MBA-O || 17.3 || 1.9 km || multiple || 2004–2019 || 03 Oct 2019 || 28 || align=left | Disc.: Kitt Peak Obs. || 
|- id="2004 TH383" bgcolor=#fefefe
| 0 ||  || MBA-I || 17.9 || data-sort-value="0.78" | 780 m || multiple || 2004–2021 || 17 Jan 2021 || 37 || align=left | Disc.: NEAT || 
|- id="2004 TJ383" bgcolor=#E9E9E9
| 0 ||  || MBA-M || 17.80 || 1.2 km || multiple || 2004–2021 || 30 Sep 2021 || 74 || align=left | Disc.: MLS || 
|- id="2004 TN383" bgcolor=#fefefe
| 0 ||  || MBA-I || 18.6 || data-sort-value="0.57" | 570 m || multiple || 2004–2020 || 25 Jan 2020 || 55 || align=left | Disc.: Spacewatch || 
|- id="2004 TO383" bgcolor=#d6d6d6
| 2 ||  || MBA-O || 17.6 || 1.7 km || multiple || 2004–2019 || 02 Nov 2019 || 44 || align=left | Disc.: LPL/Spacewatch II || 
|- id="2004 TP383" bgcolor=#fefefe
| 0 ||  || MBA-I || 18.4 || data-sort-value="0.62" | 620 m || multiple || 2004–2019 || 02 Nov 2019 || 41 || align=left | Disc.: Spacewatch || 
|- id="2004 TQ383" bgcolor=#d6d6d6
| 0 ||  || MBA-O || 16.9 || 2.3 km || multiple || 2004–2019 || 21 Oct 2019 || 48 || align=left | Disc.: Spacewatch || 
|- id="2004 TR383" bgcolor=#d6d6d6
| 0 ||  || HIL || 16.19 || 3.2 km || multiple || 2004–2021 || 28 Nov 2021 || 46 || align=left | Disc.: Kitt Peak Obs. || 
|- id="2004 TS383" bgcolor=#fefefe
| 0 ||  || MBA-I || 18.2 || data-sort-value="0.68" | 680 m || multiple || 2004–2021 || 15 Jan 2021 || 34 || align=left | Disc.: Spacewatch || 
|- id="2004 TT383" bgcolor=#fefefe
| 0 ||  || MBA-I || 18.5 || data-sort-value="0.59" | 590 m || multiple || 2004–2020 || 02 Feb 2020 || 39 || align=left | Disc.: Spacewatch || 
|- id="2004 TU383" bgcolor=#fefefe
| 0 ||  || MBA-I || 18.9 || data-sort-value="0.49" | 490 m || multiple || 2004–2020 || 15 Oct 2020 || 59 || align=left | Disc.: Spacewatch || 
|- id="2004 TV383" bgcolor=#fefefe
| 0 ||  || MBA-I || 18.7 || data-sort-value="0.54" | 540 m || multiple || 2004–2018 || 03 Jun 2018 || 26 || align=left | Disc.: Spacewatch || 
|- id="2004 TW383" bgcolor=#E9E9E9
| 0 ||  || MBA-M || 17.41 || 1.8 km || multiple || 2004–2021 || 04 May 2021 || 92 || align=left | Disc.: Spacewatch || 
|- id="2004 TX383" bgcolor=#E9E9E9
| 0 ||  || MBA-M || 17.72 || 1.6 km || multiple || 1995–2021 || 10 May 2021 || 93 || align=left | Disc.: Spacewatch || 
|- id="2004 TY383" bgcolor=#E9E9E9
| 0 ||  || MBA-M || 17.40 || 1.8 km || multiple || 2004–2021 || 15 Apr 2021 || 72 || align=left | Disc.: Spacewatch || 
|- id="2004 TZ383" bgcolor=#E9E9E9
| 0 ||  || MBA-M || 17.27 || 2.0 km || multiple || 2004–2021 || 08 Jun 2021 || 79 || align=left | Disc.: Spacewatch || 
|- id="2004 TA384" bgcolor=#d6d6d6
| 0 ||  || MBA-O || 16.2 || 3.2 km || multiple || 2004–2020 || 22 Apr 2020 || 94 || align=left | Disc.: Spacewatch || 
|- id="2004 TB384" bgcolor=#fefefe
| 0 ||  || MBA-I || 18.2 || data-sort-value="0.68" | 680 m || multiple || 2004–2019 || 19 Dec 2019 || 61 || align=left | Disc.: Spacewatch || 
|- id="2004 TC384" bgcolor=#E9E9E9
| 0 ||  || MBA-M || 17.66 || 1.6 km || multiple || 2004–2021 || 16 Apr 2021 || 71 || align=left | Disc.: LPL/Spacewatch II || 
|- id="2004 TD384" bgcolor=#E9E9E9
| 0 ||  || MBA-M || 17.50 || 1.8 km || multiple || 2004–2021 || 14 May 2021 || 67 || align=left | Disc.: Kitt Peak Obs. || 
|- id="2004 TE384" bgcolor=#d6d6d6
| 0 ||  || MBA-O || 17.3 || 1.9 km || multiple || 1999–2019 || 19 Nov 2019 || 48 || align=left | Disc.: Spacewatch || 
|- id="2004 TF384" bgcolor=#E9E9E9
| 0 ||  || MBA-M || 17.5 || 1.8 km || multiple || 2004–2020 || 21 Mar 2020 || 54 || align=left | Disc.: Kitt Peak Obs. || 
|- id="2004 TJ384" bgcolor=#fefefe
| 0 ||  || MBA-I || 18.3 || data-sort-value="0.65" | 650 m || multiple || 2004–2019 || 20 Dec 2019 || 40 || align=left | Disc.: Spacewatch || 
|- id="2004 TK384" bgcolor=#d6d6d6
| 2 ||  || MBA-O || 17.9 || 1.5 km || multiple || 2004–2019 || 05 Nov 2019 || 35 || align=left | Disc.: Spacewatch || 
|- id="2004 TL384" bgcolor=#fefefe
| 0 ||  || MBA-I || 19.00 || data-sort-value="0.47" | 470 m || multiple || 2004–2021 || 11 Apr 2021 || 62 || align=left | Disc.: Spacewatch || 
|- id="2004 TM384" bgcolor=#fefefe
| 1 ||  || MBA-I || 18.6 || data-sort-value="0.57" | 570 m || multiple || 2004–2020 || 02 Feb 2020 || 50 || align=left | Disc.: Spacewatch || 
|- id="2004 TN384" bgcolor=#d6d6d6
| 0 ||  || MBA-O || 17.2 || 2.0 km || multiple || 2004–2018 || 13 Aug 2018 || 36 || align=left | Disc.: Spacewatch || 
|- id="2004 TP384" bgcolor=#E9E9E9
| 0 ||  || MBA-M || 17.1 || 2.1 km || multiple || 2004–2021 || 07 Jun 2021 || 54 || align=left | Disc.: LONEOS || 
|- id="2004 TQ384" bgcolor=#d6d6d6
| 0 ||  || MBA-O || 16.96 || 2.3 km || multiple || 2004–2021 || 28 Nov 2021 || 75 || align=left | Disc.: Spacewatch || 
|- id="2004 TR384" bgcolor=#fefefe
| 0 ||  || MBA-I || 18.8 || data-sort-value="0.52" | 520 m || multiple || 2004–2018 || 12 Nov 2018 || 41 || align=left | Disc.: Kitt Peak Obs. || 
|- id="2004 TS384" bgcolor=#fefefe
| 0 ||  || MBA-I || 18.41 || data-sort-value="0.62" | 620 m || multiple || 2004–2021 || 01 Nov 2021 || 66 || align=left | Disc.: LONEOSAlt.: 2016 CL267 || 
|- id="2004 TT384" bgcolor=#fefefe
| 3 ||  || MBA-I || 18.5 || data-sort-value="0.59" | 590 m || multiple || 2004–2019 || 06 Jul 2019 || 26 || align=left | Disc.: Kitt Peak Obs. || 
|- id="2004 TU384" bgcolor=#E9E9E9
| 0 ||  || MBA-M || 17.6 || 1.7 km || multiple || 2004–2018 || 02 Nov 2018 || 54 || align=left | Disc.: SpacewatchAdded on 22 July 2020 || 
|- id="2004 TV384" bgcolor=#E9E9E9
| 0 ||  || MBA-M || 17.4 || 1.8 km || multiple || 2004–2020 || 21 Apr 2020 || 35 || align=left | Disc.: LPL/Spacewatch IIAdded on 22 July 2020 || 
|- id="2004 TW384" bgcolor=#E9E9E9
| 0 ||  || MBA-M || 17.2 || 2.0 km || multiple || 2004–2020 || 27 Apr 2020 || 66 || align=left | Disc.: SpacewatchAdded on 22 July 2020 || 
|- id="2004 TX384" bgcolor=#d6d6d6
| 0 ||  || MBA-O || 17.1 || 2.1 km || multiple || 2004–2020 || 10 Dec 2020 || 38 || align=left | Disc.: Kitt Peak Obs.Added on 22 July 2020 || 
|- id="2004 TZ384" bgcolor=#fefefe
| 0 ||  || MBA-I || 18.41 || data-sort-value="0.62" | 620 m || multiple || 2004–2021 || 15 Apr 2021 || 38 || align=left | Disc.: Kitt Peak Obs.Added on 22 July 2020 || 
|- id="2004 TA385" bgcolor=#d6d6d6
| 0 ||  || MBA-O || 17.1 || 2.1 km || multiple || 2004–2020 || 10 Dec 2020 || 69 || align=left | Disc.: SpacewatchAdded on 22 July 2020 || 
|- id="2004 TB385" bgcolor=#d6d6d6
| 0 ||  || MBA-O || 16.85 || 2.4 km || multiple || 2004–2022 || 07 Jan 2022 || 77 || align=left | Disc.: Kitt Peak Obs.Added on 22 July 2020 || 
|- id="2004 TD385" bgcolor=#d6d6d6
| 1 ||  || MBA-O || 17.5 || 1.8 km || multiple || 2004–2020 || 11 Oct 2020 || 43 || align=left | Disc.: Kitt Peak Obs.Added on 19 October 2020 || 
|- id="2004 TF385" bgcolor=#d6d6d6
| 0 ||  || MBA-O || 16.41 || 2.9 km || multiple || 2004–2022 || 27 Jan 2022 || 104 || align=left | Disc.: SpacewatchAdded on 19 October 2020 || 
|- id="2004 TH385" bgcolor=#d6d6d6
| 1 ||  || MBA-O || 17.5 || 1.8 km || multiple || 2004–2020 || 15 Sep 2020 || 41 || align=left | Disc.: LPL/Spacewatch IIAdded on 19 October 2020 || 
|- id="2004 TJ385" bgcolor=#fefefe
| 1 ||  || MBA-I || 19.5 || data-sort-value="0.37" | 370 m || multiple || 2004–2020 || 15 Oct 2020 || 59 || align=left | Disc.: SpacewatchAdded on 19 October 2020 || 
|- id="2004 TK385" bgcolor=#fefefe
| 0 ||  || MBA-I || 18.9 || data-sort-value="0.49" | 490 m || multiple || 2004–2018 || 12 Jul 2018 || 40 || align=left | Disc.: SpacewatchAdded on 19 October 2020 || 
|- id="2004 TL385" bgcolor=#fefefe
| 0 ||  || MBA-I || 18.6 || data-sort-value="0.57" | 570 m || multiple || 2004–2017 || 28 Sep 2017 || 28 || align=left | Disc.: SpacewatchAdded on 19 October 2020 || 
|- id="2004 TM385" bgcolor=#E9E9E9
| 1 ||  || MBA-M || 17.8 || 1.5 km || multiple || 2004–2020 || 23 Jan 2020 || 38 || align=left | Disc.: LPL/Spacewatch IIAdded on 19 October 2020 || 
|- id="2004 TN385" bgcolor=#fefefe
| 0 ||  || MBA-I || 18.75 || data-sort-value="0.53" | 530 m || multiple || 2004–2021 || 03 May 2021 || 33 || align=left | Disc.: SpacewatchAdded on 19 October 2020 || 
|- id="2004 TO385" bgcolor=#fefefe
| 3 ||  || MBA-I || 19.2 || data-sort-value="0.43" | 430 m || multiple || 2004–2018 || 06 Oct 2018 || 31 || align=left | Disc.: SpacewatchAdded on 19 October 2020 || 
|- id="2004 TP385" bgcolor=#d6d6d6
| 0 ||  || MBA-O || 17.4 || 1.8 km || multiple || 1999–2018 || 14 Sep 2018 || 49 || align=left | Disc.: MLSAdded on 17 January 2021 || 
|- id="2004 TQ385" bgcolor=#d6d6d6
| 0 ||  || MBA-O || 17.04 || 2.2 km || multiple || 2004–2022 || 11 Jan 2022 || 66 || align=left | Disc.: MLSAdded on 17 January 2021 || 
|- id="2004 TR385" bgcolor=#fefefe
| 1 ||  || MBA-I || 18.0 || data-sort-value="0.75" | 750 m || multiple || 2000–2019 || 27 Oct 2019 || 31 || align=left | Disc.: SpacewatchAdded on 17 January 2021 || 
|- id="2004 TS385" bgcolor=#fefefe
| 2 ||  || MBA-I || 19.4 || data-sort-value="0.39" | 390 m || multiple || 2004–2020 || 25 Oct 2020 || 41 || align=left | Disc.: LPL/Spacewatch IIAdded on 17 January 2021 || 
|- id="2004 TT385" bgcolor=#d6d6d6
| 2 ||  || MBA-O || 18.3 || 1.2 km || multiple || 2004–2021 || 06 Jan 2021 || 53 || align=left | Disc.: SpacewatchAdded on 17 January 2021 || 
|- id="2004 TU385" bgcolor=#d6d6d6
| 0 ||  || MBA-O || 16.7 || 2.5 km || multiple || 2004–2020 || 17 Oct 2020 || 64 || align=left | Disc.: SpacewatchAdded on 17 January 2021 || 
|- id="2004 TV385" bgcolor=#d6d6d6
| 0 ||  || MBA-O || 16.8 || 2.4 km || multiple || 2004–2021 || 05 Jan 2021 || 47 || align=left | Disc.: SpacewatchAdded on 17 January 2021 || 
|- id="2004 TW385" bgcolor=#d6d6d6
| 4 ||  || MBA-O || 17.6 || 1.7 km || multiple || 2004–2020 || 17 Oct 2020 || 31 || align=left | Disc.: SpacewatchAdded on 17 January 2021 || 
|- id="2004 TX385" bgcolor=#E9E9E9
| 0 ||  || MBA-M || 18.1 || 1.3 km || multiple || 2004–2019 || 08 Jan 2019 || 33 || align=left | Disc.: SpacewatchAdded on 17 January 2021 || 
|- id="2004 TY385" bgcolor=#d6d6d6
| 3 ||  || MBA-O || 17.8 || 1.5 km || multiple || 2004–2020 || 08 Oct 2020 || 33 || align=left | Disc.: SpacewatchAdded on 17 January 2021 || 
|- id="2004 TZ385" bgcolor=#d6d6d6
| 1 ||  || MBA-O || 17.5 || 1.8 km || multiple || 2004–2021 || 15 Jan 2021 || 62 || align=left | Disc.: SpacewatchAdded on 17 January 2021 || 
|- id="2004 TA386" bgcolor=#fefefe
| 1 ||  || MBA-I || 18.7 || data-sort-value="0.54" | 540 m || multiple || 2004–2021 || 07 Feb 2021 || 61 || align=left | Disc.: SpacewatchAdded on 17 January 2021 || 
|- id="2004 TC386" bgcolor=#fefefe
| 2 ||  || HUN || 19.1 || data-sort-value="0.45" | 450 m || multiple || 2004–2020 || 20 Oct 2020 || 22 || align=left | Disc.: SpacewatchAdded on 17 January 2021 || 
|- id="2004 TJ386" bgcolor=#d6d6d6
| 0 ||  || MBA-O || 17.2 || 2.0 km || multiple || 2004–2020 || 19 Nov 2020 || 43 || align=left | Disc.: Kitt PeakAdded on 17 January 2021 || 
|- id="2004 TK386" bgcolor=#d6d6d6
| 3 ||  || MBA-O || 16.8 || 2.4 km || multiple || 2004–2020 || 05 Nov 2020 || 32 || align=left | Disc.: MLSAdded on 17 January 2021 || 
|- id="2004 TL386" bgcolor=#E9E9E9
| 0 ||  || MBA-M || 18.0 || data-sort-value="0.75" | 750 m || multiple || 2000–2020 || 16 Oct 2020 || 62 || align=left | Disc.: MLSAdded on 17 January 2021 || 
|- id="2004 TM386" bgcolor=#E9E9E9
| 0 ||  || MBA-M || 17.0 || 1.2 km || multiple || 2003–2020 || 20 Oct 2020 || 44 || align=left | Disc.: SpacewatchAdded on 3 March 2021 || 
|- id="2004 TN386" bgcolor=#d6d6d6
| 0 ||  || MBA-O || 17.1 || 2.1 km || multiple || 2004–2020 || 10 Dec 2020 || 47 || align=left | Disc.: Kitt PeakAdded on 3 March 2021 || 
|- id="2004 TO386" bgcolor=#E9E9E9
| 1 ||  || MBA-M || 18.0 || 1.4 km || multiple || 2004–2018 || 11 Nov 2018 || 30 || align=left | Disc.: MLSAdded on 3 March 2021 || 
|- id="2004 TQ386" bgcolor=#E9E9E9
| 0 ||  || MBA-M || 17.2 || 2.0 km || multiple || 2004–2021 || 01 May 2021 || 48 || align=left | Disc.: SpacewatchAdded on 11 May 2021 || 
|- id="2004 TR386" bgcolor=#d6d6d6
| 0 ||  || MBA-O || 16.71 || 2.5 km || multiple || 2004–2021 || 26 Nov 2021 || 74 || align=left | Disc.: SpacewatchAdded on 17 June 2021 || 
|- id="2004 TS386" bgcolor=#E9E9E9
| 0 ||  || MBA-M || 17.5 || 1.8 km || multiple || 2004–2021 || 15 Apr 2021 || 40 || align=left | Disc.: Kitt PeakAdded on 17 June 2021 || 
|- id="2004 TT386" bgcolor=#E9E9E9
| 0 ||  || MBA-M || 18.37 || 1.2 km || multiple || 2004–2021 || 08 Aug 2021 || 27 || align=left | Disc.: Kitt PeakAdded on 21 August 2021 || 
|- id="2004 TV386" bgcolor=#d6d6d6
| 0 ||  || MBA-O || 17.84 || 1.5 km || multiple || 2004–2019 || 28 Aug 2019 || 30 || align=left | Disc.: MLSAdded on 21 August 2021 || 
|- id="2004 TW386" bgcolor=#E9E9E9
| 1 ||  || MBA-M || 18.82 || data-sort-value="0.72" | 720 m || multiple || 2004–2021 || 30 Nov 2021 || 57 || align=left | Disc.: SpacewatchAdded on 21 August 2021 || 
|- id="2004 TX386" bgcolor=#fefefe
| 1 ||  || MBA-I || 19.23 || data-sort-value="0.42" | 420 m || multiple || 2003–2021 || 11 Sep 2021 || 22 || align=left | Disc.: Kitt Peak Obs.Added on 21 August 2021 || 
|- id="2004 TY386" bgcolor=#fefefe
| 3 ||  || MBA-I || 19.1 || data-sort-value="0.45" | 450 m || multiple || 2004–2020 || 25 Jan 2020 || 24 || align=left | Disc.: SpacewatchAdded on 24 December 2021 || 
|- id="2004 TA387" bgcolor=#fefefe
| 0 ||  || MBA-I || 18.67 || data-sort-value="0.55" | 550 m || multiple || 2004–2021 || 27 Oct 2021 || 74 || align=left | Disc.: SpacewatchAdded on 30 September 2021 || 
|- id="2004 TC387" bgcolor=#E9E9E9
| 0 ||  || MBA-M || 18.80 || data-sort-value="0.73" | 730 m || multiple || 2004–2021 || 27 Oct 2021 || 44 || align=left | Disc.: SpacewatchAdded on 30 September 2021 || 
|- id="2004 TD387" bgcolor=#d6d6d6
| 0 ||  || MBA-O || 16.82 || 2.4 km || multiple || 2004–2021 || 30 Nov 2021 || 84 || align=left | Disc.: SpacewatchAdded on 5 November 2021 || 
|- id="2004 TE387" bgcolor=#E9E9E9
| 0 ||  || MBA-M || 17.57 || 1.3 km || multiple || 2002–2021 || 30 Nov 2021 || 110 || align=left | Disc.: SpacewatchAdded on 5 November 2021 || 
|- id="2004 TF387" bgcolor=#d6d6d6
| 2 ||  || MBA-O || 17.63 || 1.7 km || multiple || 2004–2021 || 30 Oct 2021 || 39 || align=left | Disc.: SpacewatchAdded on 5 November 2021 || 
|- id="2004 TG387" bgcolor=#d6d6d6
| 0 ||  || MBA-O || 17.07 || 2.1 km || multiple || 2004–2021 || 25 Nov 2021 || 55 || align=left | Disc.: SpacewatchAdded on 5 November 2021 || 
|- id="2004 TH387" bgcolor=#E9E9E9
| 0 ||  || MBA-M || 17.79 || 1.2 km || multiple || 2004–2021 || 30 Nov 2021 || 62 || align=left | Disc.: SpacewatchAdded on 5 November 2021 || 
|- id="2004 TJ387" bgcolor=#E9E9E9
| 0 ||  || MBA-M || 18.3 || data-sort-value="0.92" | 920 m || multiple || 2004–2021 || 04 Oct 2021 || 40 || align=left | Disc.: SpacewatchAdded on 5 November 2021 || 
|- id="2004 TK387" bgcolor=#E9E9E9
| 0 ||  || MBA-M || 17.90 || 1.1 km || multiple || 2004–2021 || 06 Nov 2021 || 57 || align=left | Disc.: Kitt PeakAdded on 5 November 2021 || 
|- id="2004 TL387" bgcolor=#E9E9E9
| 0 ||  || MBA-M || 18.35 || data-sort-value="0.90" | 900 m || multiple || 2000–2021 || 09 Nov 2021 || 62 || align=left | Disc.: SpacewatchAdded on 5 November 2021 || 
|- id="2004 TM387" bgcolor=#E9E9E9
| 0 ||  || MBA-M || 18.01 || 1.1 km || multiple || 2002–2021 || 09 Dec 2021 || 81 || align=left | Disc.: SpacewatchAdded on 24 December 2021 || 
|- id="2004 TN387" bgcolor=#d6d6d6
| 1 ||  || MBA-O || 17.43 || 1.8 km || multiple || 2004–2021 || 28 Nov 2021 || 56 || align=left | Disc.: SpacewatchAdded on 24 December 2021 || 
|- id="2004 TO387" bgcolor=#d6d6d6
| 0 ||  || MBA-O || 17.19 || 2.0 km || multiple || 2004–2021 || 30 Nov 2021 || 46 || align=left | Disc.: Kitt PeakAdded on 24 December 2021 || 
|- id="2004 TP387" bgcolor=#fefefe
| 4 ||  || MBA-I || 18.7 || data-sort-value="0.54" | 540 m || multiple || 2004–2015 || 13 Dec 2015 || 18 || align=left | Disc.: SpacewatchAdded on 24 December 2021 || 
|- id="2004 TQ387" bgcolor=#E9E9E9
| 1 ||  || MBA-M || 19.08 || data-sort-value="0.64" | 640 m || multiple || 2004–2017 || 16 Sep 2017 || 22 || align=left | Disc.: SpacewatchAdded on 24 December 2021 || 
|- id="2004 TR387" bgcolor=#FA8072
| 2 ||  || MCA || 19.41 || data-sort-value="0.39" | 390 m || multiple || 2004–2007 || 05 Nov 2007 || 20 || align=left | Disc.: SpacewatchAdded on 24 December 2021 || 
|- id="2004 TS387" bgcolor=#d6d6d6
| 0 ||  || MBA-O || 17.5 || 1.8 km || multiple || 2004–2021 || 24 Nov 2021 || 33 || align=left | Disc.: SpacewatchAdded on 24 December 2021 || 
|- id="2004 TT387" bgcolor=#fefefe
| 0 ||  || MBA-I || 19.17 || data-sort-value="0.44" | 440 m || multiple || 2004–2021 || 08 Sep 2021 || 33 || align=left | Disc.: Kitt PeakAdded on 24 December 2021 || 
|- id="2004 TU387" bgcolor=#E9E9E9
| 1 ||  || MBA-M || 18.5 || data-sort-value="0.84" | 840 m || multiple || 2004–2021 || 02 Dec 2021 || 25 || align=left | Disc.: SpacewatchAdded on 24 December 2021 || 
|- id="2004 TV387" bgcolor=#E9E9E9
| 1 ||  || MBA-M || 18.4 || data-sort-value="0.88" | 880 m || multiple || 2004–2021 || 08 Dec 2021 || 34 || align=left | Disc.: SpacewatchAdded on 24 December 2021 || 
|}
back to top

References 
 

Lists of unnumbered minor planets